= Next-generation lithography =

Novel photolithoghaphic techniques

Next-generation lithography (NGL) is a term used in integrated circuit manufacturing to describe the lithography technologies in development which are intended to replace current techniques. Driven by Moore's law in the semiconductor industries, the shrinking of the chip size and critical dimension continues. The term applies to any lithography method which uses a shorter-wavelength light or beam type than the current state of the art, such as X-ray lithography, electron beam lithography, focused ion beam lithography, and nanoimprint lithography. The term may also be used to describe techniques which achieve finer resolution features from an existing light wavelength.

Many technologies once termed "next generation" have entered commercial production, and open-air photolithography, with visible light projected through hand-drawn photomasks, has gradually progressed to deep-UV immersion lithography using optical proximity correction, inverse lithography technology, off-axis illumination, phase-shift masks, double patterning, and multiple patterning. In the late 2010s, the combination of many such techniques was able to achieve features on the order of 20 nm with the 193 nm-wavelength ArF excimer laser in the 14 nm, 10 nm and 7 nm processes, though at the cost of adding processing steps and therefore cost.

13.5 nm extreme ultraviolet (EUV) lithography, long considered a leading candidate for next-generation lithography, began to enter commercial mass-production in 2018. As of 2021, Samsung and TSMC were gradually phasing EUV lithography into their production lines, as it became economical to replace multiple processing steps with single EUV steps. As of the early 2020s, many EUV techniques are still in development and many challenges remain to be solved, positioning EUV lithography as being in transition from "next generation" to "state of the art."

Candidates for next-generation lithography beyond EUV include X-ray lithography, electron beam lithography, focused ion beam lithography, nanoimprint lithography, and quantum lithography. Several of these technologies have experienced periods of popularity, but have remained outcompeted by the continuing improvements in photolithography. Electron beam lithography was most popular during the 1970s, but was replaced in popularity by X-ray lithography during the 1980s and early 1990s, and then by EUV lithography from the mid-1990s to the mid-2000s. Focused ion beam lithography has carved a niche for itself in the area of defect repair. Nanoimprint's popularity is rising, and is positioned to succeed EUV as the most popular choice for next-generation lithography, due to its inherent simplicity and low cost of operation as well as its success in the LED, hard disk drive and microfluidics sectors.

The rise and fall in popularity of each NGL candidate has largely hinged on its throughput capability and its cost of operation and implementation. Electron beam and nanoimprint lithography are limited mainly by the throughput, while EUV and X-ray lithography are limited by implementation and operation costs. The projection of charged particles (ions or electrons) through stencil masks was also popularly considered in the early 2000s but eventually fell victim to both low throughput and implementation difficulties.

== Issues ==
Hypothetical NGL case @ 5 nm
Node	Leading chipmaker	Lagging chipmaker	
Node	Leading chipmaker	No change	With NGL
180 nm	KrF	KrF	-
130 nm	KrF	KrF	-
90nm	ArF	ArF	-
65 nm	ArF	ArF	-
45/40 nm	ArF immersion	ArF immersion	-
32/28 nm	ArF immersion	ArF immersion	-
22/20 nm	ArF immersion, double patterning	?	Skipped multipatterning costs
16/14 nm	ArF immersion, double patterning	?	Skipped multipatterning costs
10 nm	ArF immersion, SADP/triple patterning	?	Skipped multipatterning costs
7 nm	ArF immersion, SADP/SAQP	?	Skipped multipatterning costs
5 nm	SAQP + additional lithography	?	NGL
The difficulty of extending optical lithography has been the main selling point of NGL. However, a leading chipmaker would benefit significantly less than a lagging chipmaker, due to the huge additional investments in extending optical lithography up to its current state. In this hypothetical case, introducing NGL would allow some chipmakers to skip several lithography generations.
Table based on File:Node_progress.png (2016, User:Guiding Light) (CCA-SA-3.0 unported)

=== Fundamental issues ===
Regardless of whether NGL or photolithography is used, etching of polymer (resist) is the last step. Ultimately the quality (roughness) as well as resolution of this polymer etching limits the inherent resolution of the lithography technique. Next generation lithography also generally makes use of ionizing radiation, leading to secondary electrons which can limit resolution to effectively > 20 nm. Studies have also found that for NGL to reach LER (line edge roughness) objectives ways to control variables such as polymer size, image contrast and resist contrast must be found.

=== Market issues ===
The above-mentioned competition between NGL and the recurring extension of photolithography may be more a strategic than a technical matter. If a highly scalable NGL technology were to become readily available, late adopters of leading-edge technology would immediately have the opportunity to leapfrog the current use of advanced but costly photolithography techniques, at the expense of the early adopters of leading-edge technology, who have been the key investors in NGL.

The following example would make this clearer. Suppose company A manufactures down to 28 nm, while company B manufactures down to 7 nm, by extending its photolithography capability by implementing double patterning. If an NGL were deployed for the 5 nm node, both companies would benefit, but company A currently manufacturing at the 28 nm node would benefit much more because it would immediately be able to use the NGL for manufacturing at all design rules from 22 nm down to 7 nm (skipping all the said multiple patterning), while company B would only benefit starting at the 5 nm node, having already spent much on extending photolithography from its 22 nm process down to 7 nm. The gap between Company B, whose customers expect it to advance the leading edge, and Company A, whose customers don't expect an equally aggressive roadmap, will continue to widen as NGL is delayed and photolithography is extended at greater and greater cost, making the deployment of NGL less and less attractive strategically for Company B. With NGL deployment, customers will also be able to demand lower prices for products made at advanced generations.

This becomes more clear when considering that each resolution enhancement technique applied to photolithography generally extends the capability by only one or two generations. For this reason, the observation that "optical lithography will live forever" will likely hold, as the early adopters of leading-edge technology will never benefit from highly scalable lithography technologies in a competitive environment.

There is therefore great pressure to deploy an NGL as soon as possible, but the NGL ultimately may be realized in the form of photolithography with more efficient multiple patterning, such as directed self-assembly or aggressive cut reduction.

== See also ==
- Computational lithography
- Nanolithography
- Quantum lithography
