= Resolution enhancement technologies =

Part of photolithography of integrated circuits

Resolution enhancement technologies are methods used to modify the photomasks in the lithographic processes used to make integrated circuits (ICs or "chips") to compensate for limitations in the optical resolution of the projection systems. These processes allow the creation of features well beyond the limit that would normally apply due to the Rayleigh criterion. Modern technologies allow the creation of features on the order of 5 nanometers (nm), far below the normal resolution possible using deep ultraviolet (DUV) light.

== Background ==
Integrated circuits are created in a multi-step process known as photolithography. This process starts with the design of the IC circuitry as a series of layers than will be patterned onto the surface of a sheet of silicon or other semiconductor material known as a wafer.

Each layer of the ultimate design is patterned onto a photomask, which in modern systems is made of fine lines of chromium deposited on highly purified quartz glass. Chromium is used because it is highly opaque to UV light, and quartz because it has limited thermal expansion under the intense heat of the light sources as well as being highly transparent to ultraviolet light. The mask is positioned over the wafer and then exposed to an intense UV light source. With a proper optical imaging system between the mask and the wafer (or no imaging system if the mask is sufficiently closely positioned to the wafer such as in early lithography machines), the mask pattern is imaged on a thin layer of photoresist on the surface of the wafer and a light (UV or EUV)-exposed part of the photoresist experiences chemical reactions causing the photographic pattern to be physically created on the wafer.

When light shines on a pattern like that on a mask, diffraction effects occur. This causes the sharply focused light from the UV lamp to spread out on the far side of the mask and becoming increasingly unfocussed over distance. In early systems in the 1970s, avoiding these effects required the mask to be placed in direct contact with the wafer in order to reduce the distance from the mask to the surface. When the mask was lifted it would often pull off the resist coating and ruin that wafer. Producing a diffraction-free image was ultimately solved through the projection aligner systems, which dominated chip making through the 1970s and early 1980s.

The relentless drive of Moore's law ultimately reached the limit of what the projection aligners could handle. Efforts were made to extend their lifetimes by moving to ever-higher UV wavelengths, first to DUV and then to EUV, but the small amounts of light given off at these wavelengths made the machines impractical, requiring enormous lamps and long exposure times. This was solved through the introduction of the steppers, which used a mask at much larger sizes and used lenses to reduce the image. These systems continued to improve in a fashion similar to the aligners, but by the late 1990s were also facing the same issues.

At the time, there was considerable debate about how to continue the move to smaller features. Systems using excimer lasers in the soft-X-ray region were one solution, but these were incredibly expensive and difficult to work with. It was at this time that resolution enhancement began to be used.

== Basic concept ==
The basic concept underlying the various resolution enhancement systems is the creative use of diffraction in certain locations to offset the diffraction in others. For instance, when light diffracts around a line on the mask it will produce a series of bright and dark lines, or "bands". that will spread out the desired sharp pattern. To offset this, a second pattern is deposited whose diffraction pattern overlaps with the desired features, and whose bands are positioned to overlap the original pattern's to produce the opposite effect - dark on light or vice versa. Multiple features of this sort are added, and the combined pattern produces the original feature. Typically, on the mask these additional features look like additional lines lying parallel to the desired feature.

Adding these enhancement features has been an area of continual improvement since the early 2000s. In addition to using additional patterning, modern systems add phase-shifting materials, multiple-patterning and other techniques. Together, they have allowed feature size to continue to shrink to orders of magnitude below the diffraction limit of the optics.

== Using resolution enhancement ==
Traditionally, after an IC design has been converted into a physical layout, the timing verified, and the polygons certified to be DRC-clean, the IC was ready for fabrication. The data files representing the various layers were shipped to a mask shop, which used mask-writing equipment to convert each data layer into a corresponding mask, and the masks were shipped to the fab where they were used to repeatedly manufacture the designs in silicon. In the past, the creation of the IC layout was the end of the involvement of electronic design automation.

However, as Moore's law has driven features to ever-smaller dimensions, new physical effects that could be effectively ignored in the past are now affecting the features that are formed on the silicon wafer. So even though the final layout may represent what is desired in silicon, the layout can still undergo dramatic alteration through several EDA tools before the masks are fabricated and shipped. These alterations are required not to make any change in the device as designed, but to simply allow the manufacturing equipment, often purchased and optimized for making ICs one or two generations behind, to deliver the new devices. These alterations can be classed as being of two types.

The first type is distortion corrections, namely pre-compensating for distortions inherent in the manufacturing process, be it from a processing step, such as: photolithography, etching, planarization, and deposition. These distortions are measured and a suitable model fitted, compensation is carried out usually using a rule or model based algorithm. When applied to printing distortions during photolithography, this distortion compensation is known as Optical Proximity Correction (OPC).

The second type of Reticle Enhancement involves actually improving the manufacturability or resolution of the process. Examples of this include:

RET Technique	Manufacturability Improvement
Scattering Bars	Sub resolution assist features that improves the depth of focus of isolated features.
Phase-shift Mask	Etching quartz from certain areas of the mask (alt-PSM) or replacing Chrome with phase shifting Molybdenum Silicide layer (attenuated embedded PSM) to improve CD control and increase resolution
Double or Multiple Patterning	Involves decomposing the design across multiple masks to allow the printing of tighter pitches.

For each of these manufacturability improvement techniques there are certain layouts that either cannot be improved or cause issues in printing. These are classed as non-compliant layouts. These are avoided either at the design stage - using, for instance, Radically Restrictive Design Rules and/or creating addition DRC checks if appropriate. Both the lithographic compensations and manufacturability improvements are usually grouped under the heading resolution enhancement techniques (RET). Such techniques have been used since the 180nm node and have become more aggressively used as minimum feature size as dropped significantly below that of the imaging wavelength, currently limited to 13.5 nm.

This is closely related to, and a part of, the more general category of design for manufacturability (IC) or DFM.

After RET, the next step in an EDA flow is usually mask data preparation.

== See also ==
- Inverse lithography technology
