= Chris Mack (scientist) =

American scientist

Chris Mack (born 1960) is an expert in photolithography. He received multiple undergraduate degrees from Rose-Hulman Institute of Technology in 1982, a master of science degree in electrical engineering from the University of Maryland, College Park in 1989, and a PhD in chemical engineering from The University of Texas in 1998.

He became acquainted with lithography while working at the Microelectronics Research Laboratory of the NSA. After an assignment to Sematech, he quit his job at the NSA and founded FINLE Technologies (1990) to commercialize PROLITH, the simulator he had developed to model optical and chemical aspects of photolithography. FINLE Technologies was purchased in February 2000 by KLA-Tencor, which now markets PROLITH.

In 2017, he cofounded Fractilia, Inc. to deliver MetroLER, a software product that models stochastic effects in the semiconductor manufacturing process. He currently serves as CTO of Fractilia.

He is currently an adjunct faculty member at The University of Texas at Austin. He writes a quarterly column called the Lithography Expert.

In 2003 he received the Semiconductor Equipment and Materials International SEMI Award for North America. In 2005, he was the subject of the first annual Chris Mack Roast at the SPIE Microlithography conference. In 2009, Mack was awarded the Frits Zernike Award for Microlithography at the SPIE Advanced Lithography Symposium.
