= PROLITH =

PROLITH (abbreviated from Positive Resist Optical LITHography) is a computer simulator modeling the optical and chemical aspects of photolithography. Chris Mack started developing PROLITH after he began working in the field of photolithography at the NSA in 1983.

PROLITH was first developed on an IBM PC. The models implemented by the software were based on the work done by Rick Dill at IBM and Andy Neureuther at UC Berkeley, together with Chris Mack's own contributions such as the Mack model.

Originally PROLITH was given away for free, while NSA was paying Chris Mack's salary. In 1990 he founded FINLE Technologies to commercialize PROLITH. The first commercial version of the software, named PROLITH/2, was released in June of that year. PROLITH was made easier to use and it grew to include many more aspects of lithography simulation.

FINLE Technologies was purchased in February 2000 by KLA-Tencor, which now markets PROLITH.
