= X-ray lithography =

Lithographic technique that uses X-rays instead of light

X-ray lithography is a process used in semiconductor device fabrication industry to selectively remove parts of a thin film of photoresist. It uses X-rays to transfer a geometric pattern from a mask to a light-sensitive chemical photoresist, or simply "resist," on the substrate to reach extremely small topological size of a feature. A series of chemical treatments then engraves the produced pattern into the material underneath the photoresist.

It is less commonly used in commercial production due to prohibitively high costs of materials (such as gold used for X-rays blocking) etc.

== Mechanisms ==
X-ray lithography uses wavelengths below 1 nm. X-rays overcome the diffraction limits of optical lithography, allowing smaller feature sizes. If the X-ray source isn't collimated, as with synchrotron radiation, elementary collimating mirrors or diffractive lenses are used in the place of the refractive lenses used in optical lithography. As in optical lithography X-rays illuminate a mask placed in front of a resist-coated wafer. The X-rays are broadband, typically from a compact synchrotron. Deep X-ray lithography (DXRL) uses yet shorter wavelengths on the order of 0.1 nm and procedures such as LIGA to fabricate deep and even three-dimensional structures.

The mask consists of an X-ray absorber, typically of gold or compounds of tantalum or tungsten, on a membrane that is transparent to X-rays, typically of silicon carbide or diamond. The pattern on the mask is written by direct-write electron beam lithography onto a resist that is developed by conventional semiconductor processes. The membrane can be stretched for overlay accuracy.

As of 2026 most X-ray lithography demonstrations were performed by copying with image fidelity (without magnification) on the line of fuzzy contrast as illustrated in the figure. However, with the increasing need for high resolution, X-ray lithography adopted local "demagnification by bias". Dense structures are developed by multiple exposures with translation. The advantages of using (3x) demagnification include increasing the mask to wafer gap and contrast, as well as easing mask fabrication. The technique is extensible to dense 15 nm prints.

X-rays generate secondary electrons as in the cases of extreme ultraviolet lithography and electron beam lithography. While the fine pattern definition is due principally to secondaries from Auger electrons with a short path length, the primary electrons sensitize the resist over a larger region than the X-ray exposure. While this does not affect the pattern pitch resolution, which is determined by wavelength and gap, the image exposure contrast (max-min)/(max+min) is reduced because the pitch is on the order of the primary photo-electron range. The sidewall roughness and slopes are influenced by these secondary electrons as they can travel a few micrometers in the area under the absorber, depending on exposure X-ray energy. Several prints at about 30 nm have been published.

Another manifestation of the photoelectron effect is exposure to X-ray generated electrons from thick gold films used for making daughter masks. Simulations suggest that photoelectron generation from the gold substrate may affect dissolution rates.

== Photoelectrons, secondary electrons and Auger electrons ==
Secondary electrons have energies of 25 eV or less, and can be generated by any ionizing radiation (VUV, EUV, X-rays, ions and other electrons). Auger electrons have energies of hundreds of electronvolts. The secondaries (generated by and outnumbering the Auger and primary photoelectrons) are the main agents for resist exposure.

The relative ranges of photoelectron primaries and Auger electrons depend on their respective energies. These energies depend on the energy of incident radiation and on the composition of the resist. There is considerable room for optimum selection (reference 3 of the article). When Auger electrons have lower energies than primary photoelectrons, they have shorter ranges. Both decay to secondaries which interact with chemical bonds. When secondary energies are too low, they fail to break the chemical bonds and cease to affect print resolution. Experiments prove that the combined range is less than 20 nm. On the other hand, the secondaries follow a different trend below ≈30 eV: the lower the energy, the longer the mean free path though they are not then able to affect resist development.

As they decay, primary photo-electrons and Auger electrons eventually become physically indistinguishable (as in Fermi–Dirac statistics) from secondary electrons. The range of low-energy secondary electrons is sometimes larger than the range of primary photo-electrons or of Auger electrons. What matters for X-ray lithography is the effective range of electrons that have sufficient energy to make or break chemical bonds in negative or positive resists.

== Lithographic electron range ==
X-rays do not charge. The relatively large mean free path (~20 nm) of secondary electrons hinders resolution control at nanometer scale. In particular, electron beam lithography suffers negative charging by incident electrons and consequent beam spread which limits resolution. It is difficult therefore to isolate the effective range of secondaries which may be less than 1 nm.

The combined electron mean free path results in an image blur, which is usually modeled as a Gaussian function (where σ = blur) that is convolved with the expected image. As the desired resolution approaches the blur, the dose image becomes broader than the aerial image of the incident X-rays. The blur that matters is the latent image that describes the making or breaking of bonds during the exposure of resist. The developed image is the final relief image produced by the selected high contrast development process on the latent image.

The range of primary, Auger, secondary and ultralow energy higher-order generation electrons which print (as STM studies proved) can be large (tens of nm) or small (nm), according to various cited publications. Because this range is not a fixed number, it is hard to quantify. Line edge roughness is aggravated by the associated uncertainty. Line edge roughness is supposedly statistical in origin and only indirectly dependent on mean range. Under commonly practiced lithography conditions, the various electron ranges can be controlled and utilized.

== Charging ==
X-rays carry no charge, but at the energies involved, Auger decay of ionized species in a specimen is more probable than radiative decay. High-energy radiation exceeding the ionization potential also generates free electrons which are negligible compared to those produced by electron beams which are charged. Charging of the sample following ionization is an extremely weak possibility when it cannot be guaranteed the ionized electrons leaving the surface or remaining in the sample are adequately balanced from other sources in time. The energy transfer to electrons as a result of ionizing radiation results in separated positive and negative charges which quickly recombine due partly to the long range of the Coulomb force. Insulating films like gate oxides and resists have been observed to charge to a positive or negative potential under electron-beam irradiation. Insulating films are eventually neutralized locally by space charge (electrons entering and exiting the surface) at the resist-vacuum interface and Fowler-Nordheim injection from the substrate. The range of the electrons in the film can be affected by the local electric field. The situation is complicated by the presence of holes (positively charged electron vacancies) which are generated along with the secondary electrons, and which may be expected to follow them around. As neutralization proceeds, any initial charge concentration effectively starts to spread out. The final chemical state of the film is reached after neutralization is completed, after all the electrons have eventually slowed down. Usually, excepting X-ray steppers, charging can be further controlled by flood gun or resist thickness or charge dissipation layer.

== See also ==
- Photolithography
  - Excimer laser
- Extreme ultraviolet lithography
- Electron beam lithography
- Ion beam lithography

== Notes ==
1. Y. Vladimirsky, "Lithography" in Vacuum Ultraviolet Spectroscopy II Eds. J.A.Samson and D.L.Ederer, Ch 10 pp 205–223, Academic Press (1998).
2. Vladimirsky, Yuli; Bourdillon, Antony; Vladimirsky, Olga; Jiang, Wenlong; Leonard, Quinn (1999). "Demagnification in proximity x-ray lithography and extensibility to 25 nm by optimizing Fresnel diffraction". Journal of Physics D: Applied Physics. 32 (22): 114. Bibcode:1999JPhD...32..114V. doi:10.1088/0022-3727/32/22/102.
3. Antony Bourdillon and Yuli Vladimirsky, X-ray Lithography on the Sweet Spot, UHRL, San Jose, (2006) ISBN 978-0-9789839-0-1
4. Vora, K D; Shew, B Y; Harvey, E C; Hayes, J P; Peele, A G (2008). "Sidewall slopes of SU-8 HARMST using deep x-ray lithography". Journal of Micromechanics and Microengineering. 18 (3) 035037. Bibcode:2008JMiMi..18c5037V. doi:10.1088/0960-1317/18/3/035037.
5. Early, K; Schattenburg, M; Smith, H (1990). "Absence of resolution degradation in X-ray lithography for λ from 4.5nm to 0.83nm". Microelectronic Engineering. 11: 317. doi:10.1016/0167-9317(90)90122-A.
6. Carter, D. J. D. (1997). "Direct measurement of the effect of substrate photoelectrons in x-ray nanolithography". Journal of Vacuum Science and Technology B. 15 (6): 2509. Bibcode:1997JVSTB..15.2509C. doi:10.1116/1.589675.
7. Lud, Simon Q.; Steenackers, Marin; Jordan, Rainer; Bruno, Paola; Gruen, Dieter M.; Feulner, Peter; Garrido, Jose A.; Stutzmann, Martin (2006). "Chemical Grafting of Biphenyl Self-Assembled Monolayers on Ultrananocrystalline Diamond". Journal of the American Chemical Society. 128 (51): 16884–91. doi:10.1021/ja0657049. PMID 17177439.
8. Glavatskikh, I. A.; Kortov, V. S.; Fitting, H.-J. (2001). "Self-consistent electrical charging of insulating layers and metal-insulator-semiconductor structures". Journal of Applied Physics. 89: 440. Bibcode:2001JAP....89..440G. doi:10.1063/1.1330242.
