= Proximity effect (electron beam lithography) =

The proximity effect in electron-beam lithography (EBL) is the phenomenon that the exposure dose distribution, and hence the developed pattern, is wider than the scanned pattern due to the interactions of the primary beam electrons with the resist and substrate. These cause the resist outside the scanned pattern to receive a non-zero dose. The proximity effect can result in overexposure or underexposure.

Important contributions to weak-resist polymer chain scission (for positive resists) or crosslinking (for negative resists) come from electron forward scattering and backscattering. The forward scattering process is due to electron-electron interactions which deflect the primary electrons by a typically small angle, thus statistically broadening the beam in the resist (and further in the substrate). The majority of the electrons do not stop in the resist but penetrate the substrate. These electrons can still contribute to resist exposure by scattering back into the resist and causing subsequent inelastic or exposing processes. This backscattering process originates e.g. from a collision with a heavy particle (i.e. substrate nucleus) and leads to wide-angle scattering of the light electron from a range of depths (micrometres) in the substrate. The Rutherford backscattering probability increases quickly with substrate nuclear charge.

The above effects can be approximated by a simple two-gaussian model where a perfect point-like electron beam is broadened to a superposition of a Gaussian with a width ${\displaystyle \alpha }$ of a few nanometers to order tens of nanometers, depending on the acceleration voltage, due to forward scattering, and a Gaussian with a width ${\displaystyle \beta }$ of the order of a few micrometres to order tens due to backscattering, again depending on the acceleration voltage but also on the materials involved:

$$PSF(r)=\frac{1}{\pi (1+\eta)} \left[\frac{1}{\alpha^2} e^{-\frac{r^2}{\alpha^2}} + \frac{\eta}{\beta^2} e^{-\frac{r^2}{\beta^2}}\right]$$

$\eta$ is of order 1 so the contribution of backscattered electrons to the exposure is of the same order as the contribution of 'direct' forward scattered electrons. $\alpha$, $\beta$ and $\eta$ are determined by the resist and substrate materials and the primary beam energy. The two-gaussian model parameters, including the development process, can be determined experimentally by exposing shapes for which the Gaussian integral is easily solved, i.e. donuts, with increasing dose and observing at which dose the center resist clears or does not clear.

A thin resist with a low electron density will reduce forward scattering. A light substrate (light nuclei) will reduce backscattering. When electron beam lithography is performed on substrates with 'heavy' films, such as gold coatings, the backscatter effect will (depending on thickness) significantly increase. Increasing beam energy will reduce the forward scattering width, but since the beam penetrates the substrate more deeply, the backscatter width will increase.

The primary beam can transfer energy to electrons via elastic collisions with electrons and via inelastic collision processes such as impact ionization. In the latter case, a secondary electron is created and the energy state of the atom changes, which can result in the emission of Auger electrons or X-rays. The range of these secondary electrons is an energy-dependent accumulation of (inelastic) mean free paths; while not always a repeatable number, it is this range (up to 50 nanometers) that ultimately affects the practical resolution of the EBL process. The model described above can be extended to include these effects.

The electron scattering behaves according to a point spread function (PSF) that gives energy as a radial function of distance from the point that the electron beam (e-beam) hits the material.
