= Off-axis illumination =

Optical system setup in photolithography

In photolithography, off-axis illumination is an optical system setup in which the incoming light strikes a photomask at an oblique angle rather than perpendicularly to it, that is to say, the incident light is not parallel to the axis of the optical system.

The advantages of off-axis illumination can be explained in the context where the pattern on the photomask is a diffraction grating with a small pitch. The light that strikes the diffraction grating is diffracted in various directions. If the light is incident on the grating at the normal angle (along the axis of the optical system), then the zero-th diffracted order light continues to propagate along the optical system axis (as if just passing through the grating without being affected), while the other diffraction orders are diffracted sideways, with the amount of angular deviation increasing as the pitch of the grating is decreasing. (In other words, the light of a non-zero diffraction order propagates from the diffraction grating at a larger angle with respect to the grating optical axis if the grating structure is finer.) For a sufficiently small pitch, only the 0th diffraction order manages to make it through the projection lens (as a lithography machine optical component that images the pattern on the photomask to a photoresist layer on a wafer), with the other orders being lost due to a limited size of the lens (which manufacturing cost goes up as its size becomes larger). The result is that no pattern is created on the wafer, since the 0th diffraction order only contains the average of the photomask pattern.

By making the off-axis illumination (i.e., the light is illuminating the mask at an oblique angle), all the diffraction orders from the mask are tilted, which makes it more likely that the higher diffraction orders can make it through the projection lens and help form the image of the mask onto the wafer.
