= Outline of semiconductors =

Overview of and topical guide to semiconductors

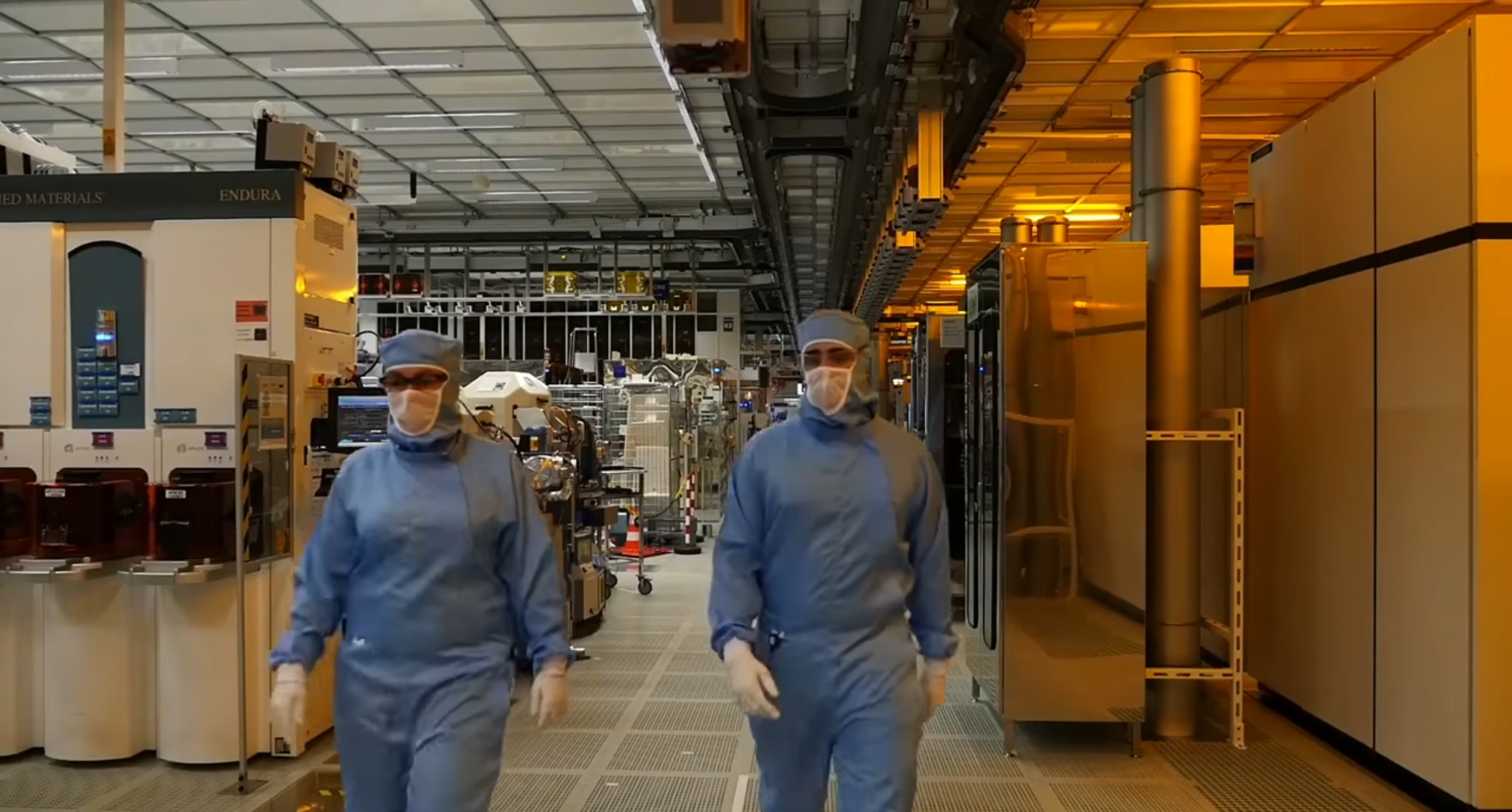

The following outline is provided as an overview of and topical guide to semiconductors:

Semiconductor – material whose electrical conductivity lies between that of a conductor and an insulator. Semiconductors form the basis of most modern electronics, including transistors, integrated circuits, solar cells, light-emitting diodes, and many other electronic and optoelectronic devices.

== Fundamentals ==
- Semiconductor
- Solid-state physics
- Electronic band structure
  - Band gap
  - Conduction band
  - Valence band
  - Fermi level
- Charge carrier
  - Electron
  - Electron hole
  - Electron mobility
  - Carrier generation and recombination
- Electrical conductivity
- Doping (semiconductor)
  - Intrinsic semiconductor
  - Extrinsic semiconductor
  - N-type semiconductor
  - P-type semiconductor
- P–n junction
- Heterojunction
- Schottky barrier
- Quantum tunnelling
- Photoconductivity
- Hall effect

== Semiconductor materials ==
- Amorphous semiconductor
- Compound semiconductor
- Magnetic semiconductor
- Organic semiconductor
- Two-dimensional semiconductor
- Wide-bandgap semiconductor

=== Elemental semiconductors ===
- Diamond
- Germanium
- Selenium
- Silicon
  - Amorphous silicon
  - Crystalline silicon
- Tellurium

=== Compound semiconductors ===
- Aluminium gallium arsenide
- Cadmium telluride
- Gallium arsenide
- Gallium nitride
- Gallium phosphide
- Indium arsenide
- Indium gallium arsenide
- Indium gallium nitride
- Indium phosphide
- Silicon carbide
- Silicon–germanium
- Zinc oxide

=== Types by chemical composition ===
- I–VII
- II–V
- II–VI
- III
- III–V
- IV
- IV–VI
- V–VI
- VI
- I–III–VI_{2}

=== Other types ===
- Charge-transfer complexes
- Magnetic semiconductors
- Metal-organic framework semiconductors
- Organic semiconductors

== Semiconductor devices ==
- Semiconductor device
- Discrete device

=== Diodes ===
- Diode
  - Avalanche diode
  - Laser diode
  - Light-emitting diode
  - PIN diode
  - Photodiode
  - Schottky diode
  - Tunnel diode
  - Varicap
  - Zener diode

=== Transistors ===
- Transistor
  - Bipolar junction transistor
  - Field-effect transistor
    - Junction field-effect transistor
    - MOSFET
      - FinFET
      - Gate-all-around FET
  - High-electron-mobility transistor
  - Phototransistor
  - Thin-film transistor

=== Power semiconductor devices ===
- Power semiconductor device
  - Power MOSFET
  - Insulated-gate bipolar transistor
  - Thyristor
    - Silicon controlled rectifier
    - TRIAC

=== Optoelectronic devices ===
- Optoelectronics
- Photodetector
  - Avalanche photodiode
  - Photodiode
- Light-emitting diode
- Laser diode
- Image sensor
  - Charge-coupled device
  - Active-pixel sensor

== Integrated circuits ==
- Integrated circuit
- Application-specific integrated circuit
- Analog integrated circuit
- Digital integrated circuit
- Field-programmable gate array
- Mixed-signal integrated circuit
- Radio-frequency integrated circuit
- System on a chip

=== Processors ===
- AI accelerator
- Central processing unit
- Digital signal processor
- Graphics processing unit
- Microcontroller
- Microprocessor
- Neural processing unit

=== Semiconductor memory ===
- Semiconductor memory
- Volatile memory
  - Random-access memory
    - Static random-access memory
    - Dynamic random-access memory
      - High Bandwidth Memory
- Non-volatile memory
  - Read-only memory
  - EEPROM
  - Flash memory
    - NAND flash
  - Magnetoresistive random-access memory
  - Ferroelectric RAM
  - Phase-change memory
  - Resistive random-access memory

== Integrated circuit design ==
- Integrated circuit design
- Circuit design
- Semiconductor intellectual property core
- Standard cell
- Process design kit

=== Hardware description and logic design ===
- Hardware description language
  - Verilog
  - VHDL
  - SystemVerilog
- Register-transfer level
- Logic design
- Logic synthesis

=== Verification ===
- Formal verification
- Functional verification
- Hardware verification language
- Static timing analysis

=== Physical design ===
- Physical design (electronics)
- Integrated circuit layout
- Place and route
- Design rule checking
- Mask data preparation
- Tape-out

== Electronic design automation software ==
- Electronic design automation

=== Technology CAD and process simulation ===
- Technology CAD
- Semiconductor process simulation
- Semiconductor device modeling

=== Circuit simulation ===
- Electronic circuit simulation
- SPICE
  - Ngspice
  - LTspice

=== Hardware simulation and verification ===
- Formal verification
- Icarus Verilog
- Layout versus schematic
- List of HDL simulators
- ModelSim
- Verilator

=== Logic synthesis and physical design ===
- Logic synthesis
- Physical design (electronics)
- Place and route
- Routing (electronic design automation)
- OpenROAD Project
- Magic
- Electric

=== EDA companies ===
- Cadence Design Systems
- Siemens EDA
- Silvaco
- Synopsys

== Semiconductor manufacturing ==
- Semiconductor device fabrication
- Semiconductor fabrication plant
- Cleanroom
- Wafer (electronics)

=== Crystal and wafer production ===
- Monocrystalline silicon
- Czochralski process
- Float-zone silicon
- Silicon on insulator
- Epitaxy

=== Lithography and patterning ===
- Photolithography
  - Extreme ultraviolet lithography
  - Immersion lithography
- Electron-beam lithography
- Nanoimprint lithography
- Photoresist
- Photomask
- Spin coating
- Stepper
- Mask aligner

=== Deposition and crystal growth ===
- Chemical vapor deposition
- Physical vapor deposition
- Atomic layer deposition
- Sputter deposition
- Molecular-beam epitaxy
- Metalorganic vapour-phase epitaxy
- Thermal oxidation

=== Etching and material removal ===
- Etching
- Plasma etching
- Reactive-ion etching
- Deep reactive-ion etching
- Atomic layer etching
- Chemical-mechanical polishing

=== Doping and modification ===
- Doping (semiconductor)
- Ion implantation
- Rapid thermal processing
- Thermal oxidation

=== Cleaning and contamination control ===
- RCA clean
- Cleanroom
- Ultrapure water

=== Front-end and back-end processing ===
- Front end of line
- Back end of line
- Electromigration

=== Process technology and scaling ===
- MOSFET scaling
- Process node
- Moore's law
- Dennard scaling

== Semiconductor packaging ==
- Integrated circuit packaging
- Die (integrated circuit)
- Wafer dicing
- Wire bonding
- Flip chip
- Ball grid array
- Chip scale package
- Wafer-level packaging
- Through-silicon via
- Multi-chip module
- System in a package
- Package on a package
- Three-dimensional integrated circuit
- Chiplet

== Semiconductor testing and reliability ==
- Wafer testing
- Wafer prober
- Automatic test equipment
- Design for testing
- Built-in self-test
- JTAG
- Burn-in
- Failure analysis
- Probe card
- Reliability engineering
- Yield

== Semiconductor manufacturing processes and equipment ==
- Atomic force microscopy
- Atomic layer deposition
- Chemical-mechanical polishing
- Chemical vapor deposition
- Dicing saw
- Ellipsometry
- Ion implantation
- Mask aligner
- Photomask
- Probe card
- Reactive-ion etching
- Scanning electron microscope
- Stepper
- Wafer prober

== Photovoltaics and solar energy conversion ==
- Photovoltaics
- Photovoltaic effect
- Solar cell
- Solar cell research
- List of types of solar cells

=== Semiconductor solar cells ===
- Anti-reflective coating
- Concentrator photovoltaics
- Crystalline silicon
- Dye-sensitized solar cell
- Luminescent solar concentrator
- Multi-junction solar cell
- Organic solar cell
- Perovskite solar cell
- Plasmonic solar cell
- Quantum dot solar cell
- Thin-film solar cell
  - Amorphous silicon
  - Cadmium telluride photovoltaics
  - Copper indium gallium selenide solar cell

=== Photoelectrochemistry and artificial photosynthesis ===
- Photoelectrochemistry
- Photoelectrochemical cell
- Photoelectrolysis of water
- Photocatalysis
- Photocatalytic water splitting
- Artificial photosynthesis
- Biohybrid solar cell

== Photonics and light-emitting semiconductors ==
- Photonics
- Optoelectronics
- Semiconductor laser
- Laser diode
- Light-emitting diode
- Solid-state lighting
- Photodetector
- Photonic integrated circuit
- Silicon photonics

== Applications ==
=== Computing ===
- AI accelerator
- Computer hardware
- Data center
- Embedded system
- Graphics processing unit
- Microcontroller
- Microprocessor

=== Communications ===
- Microwave engineering
- Mobile phone
- Optical fiber communication
- Photonics
- Radio-frequency engineering
- Telecommunications

=== Consumer and industrial electronics ===
- Automation
- Consumer electronics
- Industrial electronics
- Internet of things
- Robotics

=== Transportation ===
- Automotive electronics
- Avionics
- Electric vehicle
- Railway signalling

=== Power and energy ===
- Inverter (electrical)
- Photovoltaics
- Power electronics
- Power semiconductor device
- Renewable energy
- Smart grid

=== Sensing and imaging ===
- Digital camera
- Image sensor
- Lidar
- Medical imaging
- Microelectromechanical systems
- Sensor

== Advanced and emerging semiconductor technologies ==
=== Advanced transistor technologies ===
- FinFET
- Gate-all-around FET
- High-electron-mobility transistor
- Tunnel field-effect transistor

=== Advanced materials ===
- Magnetic semiconductor
- Organic semiconductor
- Two-dimensional semiconductor
- Wide-bandgap semiconductor
  - Gallium nitride
  - Silicon carbide

=== Quantum semiconductor structures ===
- Quantum confinement
- Quantum well
- Quantum wire
- Quantum dot
- Semiconductor heterostructure
- Superlattice

=== Advanced integration ===
- Chiplet
- Multi-chip module
- System in a package
- Three-dimensional integrated circuit
- Through-silicon via

=== Emerging computing and electronics ===
- Flexible electronics
- Neuromorphic computing
- Photonic integrated circuit
- Printed electronics
- Silicon photonics
- Spintronics
- Wafer-scale integration

== Semiconductor industry ==
- Semiconductor industry
- Integrated device manufacturer
- Fabless manufacturing
- Foundry model
- Semiconductor fabrication plant
- Outsourced semiconductor assembly and test
- Semiconductor consolidation
- 2020–2023 global chip shortage
- CHIPS and Science Act

=== Semiconductor industry by country ===
- Semiconductor industry in China
- Semiconductor industry in Japan
- Semiconductor industry in South Korea
- Semiconductor industry in Taiwan
- Semiconductor industry in the United States

=== Major companies ===
Fabless companies

- AMD
- Alchip
- Broadcom
- Cirrus Logic
- Marvell Technology
- MediaTek
- Nvidia
- Qualcomm
- Realtek
- Silicon Labs
- UNISOC

Foundries

- GlobalFoundries
- Hua Hong
- Powerchip
- SMIC
- TSMC
- Tower Semiconductor
- UMC
- Vanguard
- X-FAB

Integrated device manufacturers

- Infineon Technologies
- Intel
- Kioxia
- Micron Technology
- NXP Semiconductors
- Onsemi
- Renesas Electronics
- Samsung Electronics
- SK Hynix
- STMicroelectronics
- Texas Instruments

Equipment companies

- Advantest
- Applied Materials
- ASM International
- ASML
- Axcelis Technologies
- KLA Corporation
- Kokusai Electric
- Lam Research
- SCREEN Holdings
- Teradyne
- Tokyo Electron

== History ==
- Crystal detector
- Point-contact transistor
- History of the transistor
- Bell Labs
- Shockley Semiconductor Laboratory
- Traitorous eight
- Fairchild Semiconductor
- Silicon Valley
- Planar process
- MOSFET
- Invention of the integrated circuit
- Microprocessor
- Very Large Scale Integration
- Moore's law

== Research organizations and institutions ==
- Albany NanoTech Complex
- Birck Nanotechnology Center (Purdue University)
- CEA-Leti
- IMEC
- Industrial Technology Research Institute
- Semiconductor Research Corporation

== Industry and technical organizations ==
- Institute of Electrical and Electronics Engineers
- International Roadmap for Devices and Systems
- International Technology Roadmap for Semiconductors
- JEDEC
- SEMI

== Books ==
- Chip War
- Crystal Fire: The Birth of the Information Age
- Electrons and Holes in Semiconductors with Applications to Transistor Electronics
- The Art of Electronics
- The Idea Factory

== Lists ==
- List of integrated circuit manufacturers
- List of semiconductor companies in the United States
- List of semiconductor fabrication plants
- List of semiconductor materials
- List of semiconductor occupations
- List of system on a chip suppliers
- List of types of solar cells

== See also ==
- Outline of electronics
- Outline of electrical engineering
- Outline of nanotechnology
- Outline of computing
- Outline of physics
- Outline of energy
- Microelectronics
- Nanoelectronics
- Solid-state electronics
- Materials science
