= List of semiconductor companies in the United States =

List of notable semiconductor companies headquartered in the United States

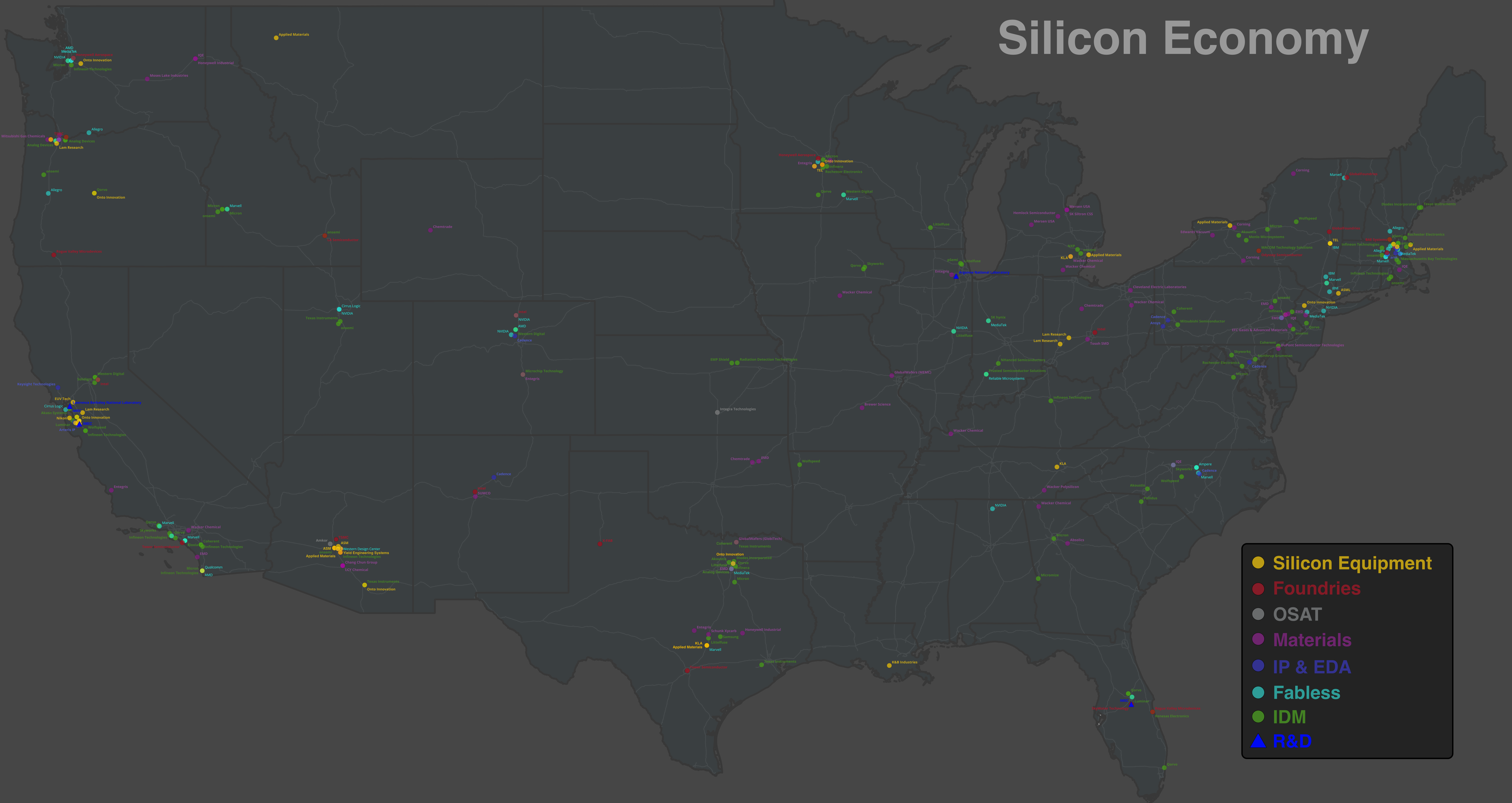
American semiconductor economy

This is a list of semiconductor companies in the United States including notable firms engaged in the design, fabrication, assembly, testing, or supply of semiconductor devices and materials. The U.S. semiconductor industry encompasses Integrated device manufacturers (IDMs), fabless design companies, foundries, and suppliers of semiconductor equipment and materials.

== Notable companies ==
=== A ===
- Achronix
- ACM Research
- Advanced Linear Devices
- Air Liquide
- Alereon
- Ambarella Inc.
- Ambiq Micro
- AMD
- Amkor Technology
- Amlogic
- Ampere Computing
- Ansys
- Analog Devices
- Applied Materials
- Aptina
- Arm Holdings
- Arteris
- ASM International
- ASML
- Atomera

=== B ===
- BAE Systems
- Bosch
- Broadcom

=== C ===
- Cadence Design Systems
- Canesta
- Cascade Microtech
- Cerebras
- Chelsio Communications
- Cirrus Logic
- Coherent Corp.
- Corning Inc.
- Cortina Systems
- Crossbar

=== D ===
- Diodes Incorporated
- DisplayLink

=== E ===
- Edwards Vacuum
- Efficient Power Conversion
- Entegris
- Entropic Communications
- ESilicon
- Everspin Technologies

=== F ===
- FormFactor
- FSI International

=== G ===
- GainSpan
- GlobalFoundries
- GlobalWafers
- Grandis
- Greenliant Systems
- Groq

=== H ===
- Helix Semiconductors
- Hemlock Semiconductor
- Honeywell Aerospace

=== I ===
- IBM
- IMEC
- Infineon Technologies
- Inphi Corporation
- Integra Technologies
- Intel
- Intersil
- InvenSense
- IQE

=== J ===
- Jazz Semiconductor

=== K ===
- Keysight Technologies
- Kioxia
- KLA

=== L ===
- Lam Research
- Lattice Semiconductor
- LCY Chemical
- Linde plc
- Linear Integrated Systems
- Littelfuse
- Luminar Technologies
- Luxtera

=== M ===
- MACOM Technology Solutions
- Mattson Technology
- Marvell Technology
- MaxLinear
- MCube
- MediaTek
- Mersen
- Microchip Technology
- Micron Technology
- MIPS Technologies
- Mitsubishi Electric United States
- Mitsubishi Gas Chemical Company
- MoSys
- Multibeam Corporation

=== N ===
- NeoMagic
- Nikon
- Nvidia
- NXP Semiconductors

=== O ===
- Onsemi
- Onto Innovation
- Open-Silicon
- OPTi
- Orbit Semiconductor

=== P ===
- PA Semiconductor
- Packet Digital
- Peregrine Semiconductor
- Photronics
- Pixelworks
- Pulse~Link

=== Q ===
- Qorvo
- Qualcomm

=== R ===
- Rabbit Semiconductor
- Rambus
- Reading Works
- Renesas Electronics
- RF Micropower
- Rochester Electronics

=== S ===
- S3 Graphics
- Samsung Electronics
- Sarnoff Corporation
- Semtech
- ServerWorks
- SiBeam
- SiFive
- Silego Technology
- Silicon Labs
- Silicon Motion
- Silicon Systems
- Siltronic
- SiTime
- SK Hynix
- SkyWater Technology
- Skyworks Solutions
- Socionext
- Solidigm
- Solvay S.A.
- SUMCO
- Synopsys
- Synaptics

=== T ===
- Texas Instruments
- Tower Semiconductor
- Transphorm
- TSMC

=== V ===
- Vishay Intertechnology

=== W ===
- Western Design Center
- Western Digital
- Wolfspeed

=== X ===
- Xperi

=== Z ===
- Zero ASIC
- Zilog

=== 0–9 ===
- 3M

== See also ==
- List of semiconductor companies by country
- List of semiconductor fabrication plants
- List of semiconductor occupations
- Outline of semiconductors
- Semiconductor Industry Association and Semiconductor Research Corporation
- Semiconductor industry in Taiwan
- Semiconductor industry in South Korea
- Semiconductor industry in Japan
- Semiconductor industry in China
- Semiconductor industry in the United States
- Semiconductor industry in India
