= List of semiconductor occupations =

Occupations in the semiconductor industry

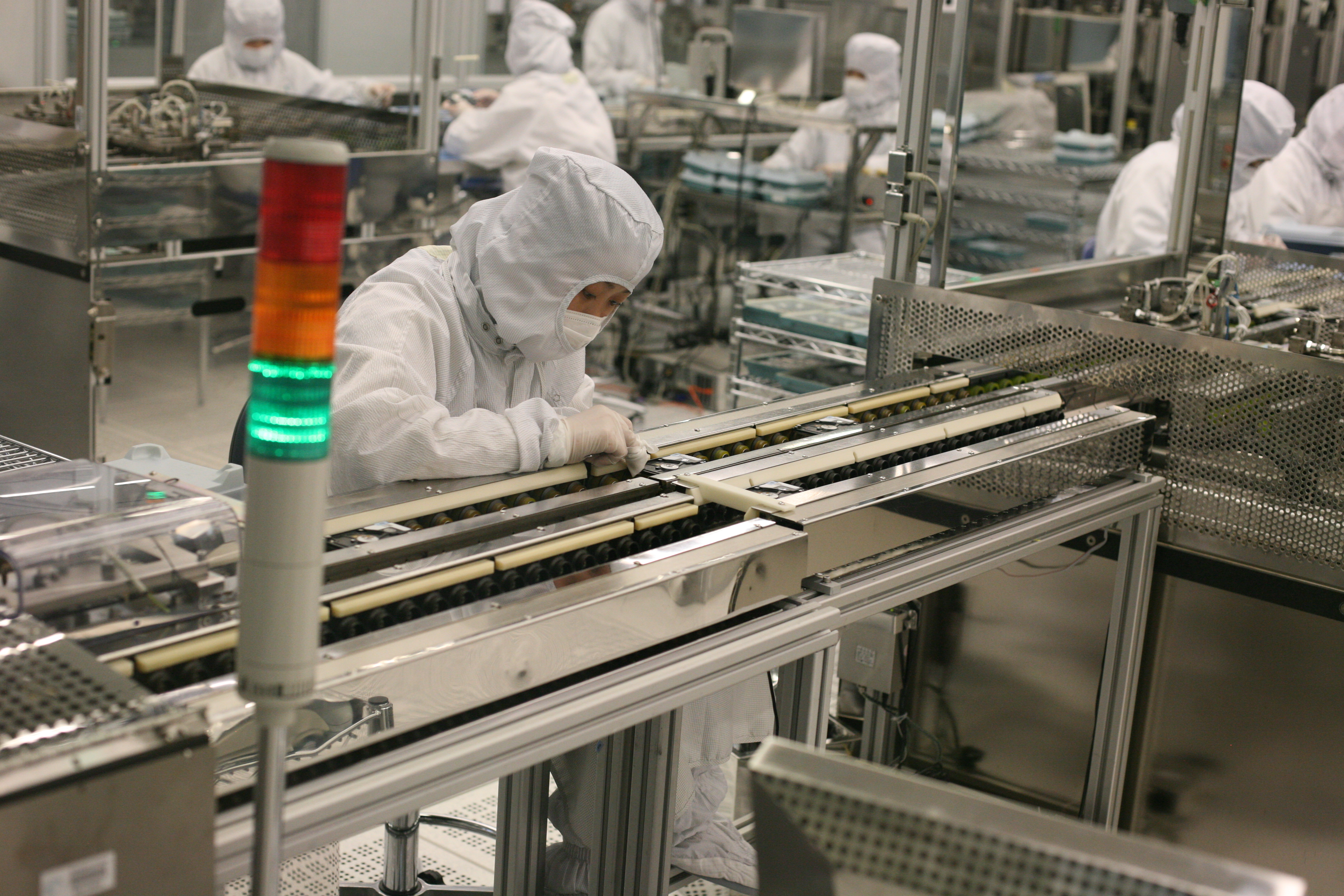
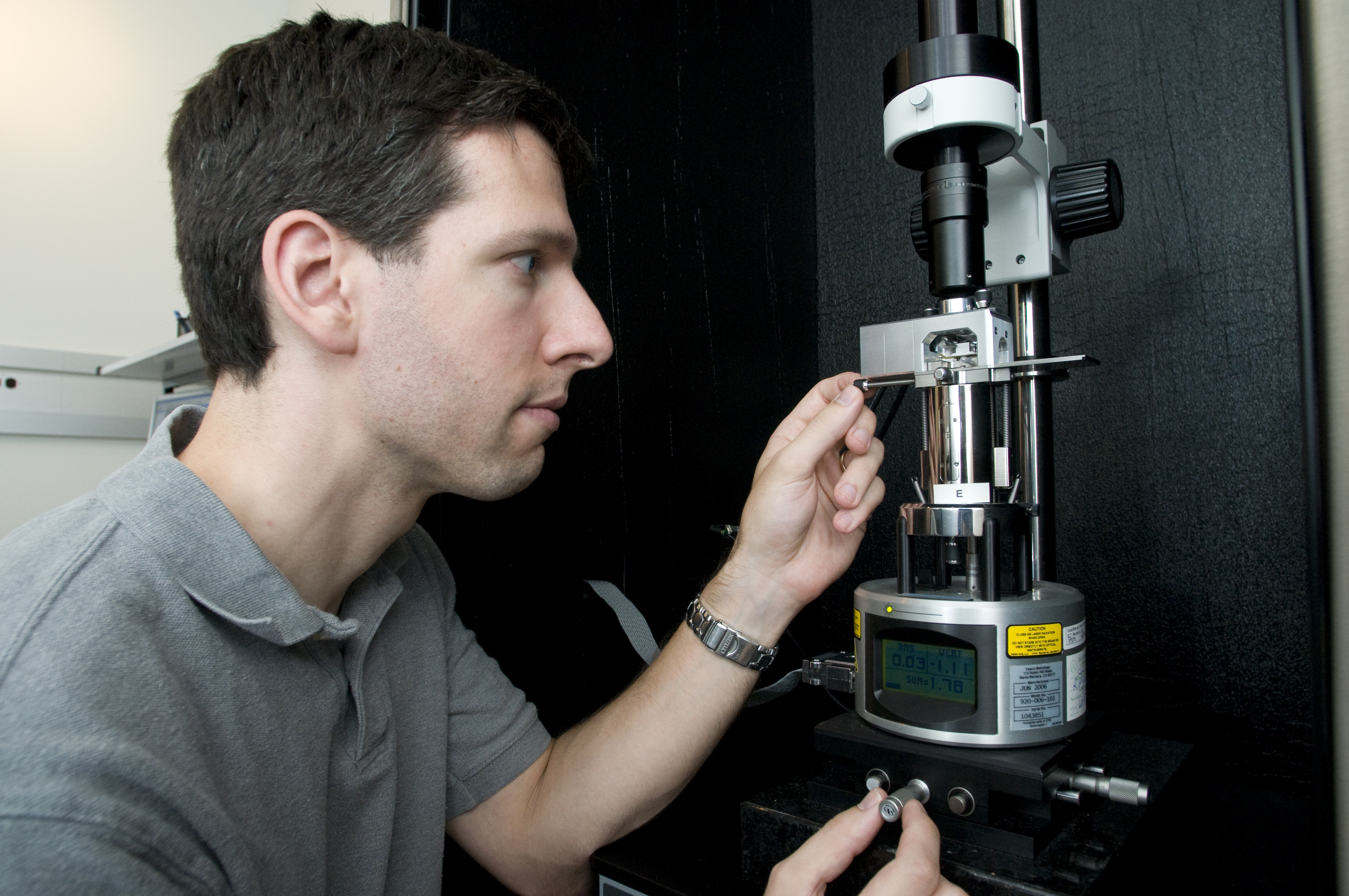

This is a list of semiconductor occupations, including occupations involved in the semiconductor industry, integrated circuit design, semiconductor device fabrication, manufacturing equipment, packaging, testing, and semiconductor research. The semiconductor workforce includes engineers, scientists, technicians, and production workers involved in the development and manufacture of semiconductor devices and integrated circuits.

== Design and applications ==
- Analog design engineer
- Applications engineer
- ASIC design engineer
- Circuit design engineer
- Computer hardware engineer
- Digital design engineer
- Electronic design automation (EDA) engineer
- FPGA engineer
- Integrated circuit design engineer
- Logic design engineer
- Physical design engineer
- RF engineer
- SoC design engineer
- Test design engineer
- Verification engineer
- VLSI design engineer

== Fabrication and process engineering ==
- Chemical engineer
- Chemical mechanical polishing (CMP) engineer
- Device engineer
- Diffusion engineer
- Etch engineer
- Ion implantation engineer
- Lithography engineer
- Materials engineer
- Metrology engineer
- Process engineer
- Process integration engineer
- Thin-film engineer
- Yield engineer

== Equipment and facilities ==
- Automation engineer
- Controls engineer
- Equipment technician
- Facilities engineer
- Field service engineer
- Mechanical engineer
- Mechatronics engineer
- PLC technician
- Vacuum engineer
- Vacuum technician

== Manufacturing ==
- Industrial engineer
- Manufacturing engineer
- Production engineer
- Production operator
- Semiconductor manufacturing technician
- Wafer fabrication operator

== Packaging and assembly ==
- Assembly engineer
- Die-attach technician
- Flip-chip process engineer
- Packaging engineer
- Packaging technician
- Semiconductor packaging engineer
- Wire-bond technician

== Testing and quality ==
- Automatic test equipment (ATE) engineer
- Failure analysis engineer
- Metrology technician
- Product engineer
- Quality control inspector
- Quality engineer
- Reliability engineer
- Semiconductor test engineer
- Test technician

== Research and development ==
- Electrical engineer
- Electronics engineer
- Materials scientist
- Microelectronics engineer
- Nanotechnology engineer
- Physicist
- Research engineer
- Semiconductor physicist
- Solid-state physicist

== See also ==
- Comparison of EDA software
- Electronic circuit simulation
- List of plasma physics software
- List of semiconductor companies by country
- List of semiconductor companies in the United States
- List of semiconductor fabrication plants
- Lists of engineers
- Lists of occupations
- Outline of semiconductors
- Semiconductor fabrication plant
- Semiconductor Industry Association
- Semiconductor industry in South Korea
- Semiconductor industry in Taiwan
- Semiconductor industry in the United States
- Semiconductor process simulation
- Semiconductor wafers
- Wafer-scale integrated circuit
