= List of types of solar cells =

A solar cell (also called photovoltaic cell or photoelectric cell) is a solid state electrical device that converts the energy of light directly into electricity by the photovoltaic effect, which is a physical and chemical phenomenon. It is a form of photoelectric cell, defined as a device whose electrical characteristics, such as current, voltage or resistance, vary when exposed to light.

The following are the different types of solar cells.

- Amorphous Silicon solar cell (a-Si)
- Biohybrid solar cell
- Cadmium telluride solar cell (CdTe)
- Concentrated PV cell (CVP and HCVP)
- Copper indium gallium selenide solar cells (CI(G)S)
- Crystalline silicon solar cell (c-Si)
  - Aluminium Back surface field (Al-BSF)
  - Passivated Emitter Rear Cell (PERC)
  - Tunnel Oxide Passivated Contact (TOPCon)
  - Heterojunction (HJT)
- Float-zone silicon
- Dye-sensitized solar cell (DSSC)
- Gallium arsenide germanium solar cell (GaAs)
- Hybrid solar cell
- List of solar engines
- Luminescent solar concentrator cell (LSC)
- Micromorph (tandem-cell using a-Si/μc-Si)
- Monocrystalline solar cell (mono-Si)
- Multi-junction solar cell (MJ)
- Nanocrystal solar cell
- Organic solar cell (OPV)
- Perovskite solar cell
- Photoelectrochemical cell (PEC)
- Plasmonic solar cell
- Polycrystalline solar cell (multi-Si)
- Quantum dot solar cell
- Solid-state solar cell
- Thin-film solar cell (TFSC)
- Wafer solar cell, or wafer-based solar cell crystalline
- Non concentrated hetrogeneos PV cell
