= Xsens =

Electronics company in the Netherlands

Xsens (Xsens Technologies B.V.)
- Industry: motion capture, IMU, AHRS, INS
- Founded: 2000
- Founders: Casper Peeters, Per Slycke
- Headquarters: Enschede, Netherlands
- Number of locations: 6
- Key people: Eric Salzman (CEO), Steve Smith (CFO)
- Products: MTi, MTw Awinda, MVN Animate, MVN Analyze, Xsens DOT
- Number of employees: 200
- Website: www.xsens.com

Xsens Technologies B.V. (or Xsens) is a supplier of 3D motion capture products and inertial sensors based upon miniature MEMS inertial sensor technology.

The company has created intellectual property in the field of multi-sensor data fusion algorithms, combining inertial sensors with aiding technologies such as GPS, Motion capture and biomechanical modeling.

Xsens has offices in Enschede (headquarter, Netherlands), Los Angeles, Shanghai, and Halifax.

== History ==
The company was founded in 2000 by Casper Peeters and Per Slycke, both University of Twente graduates. Following work in measurement of the performance of athletes, they specialized in sensor technologies and sensor fusion algorithms. The company developed Inertial measurement units or AHRS (MTi-series and MTx) and human movement measurement systems (a completely wireless system MTw Awinda, the successor of the Xbus Kit).

In 2007 Xsens introduced an inertial motion capture system called "Moven" (renamed to Xsens MVN in 2009).

In 2008, Xsens acquired Utellus, a spin-off from telecom company Ericsson's EuroLab, specializing in applications of ultra wide band RF technology.

In 2009 Xsens introduced the MVN BIOMECH system, a motion capture system for 3D human kinematics used in fields such as ergonomics, sports science and rehabilitation.

In 2014 Xsens was acquired by Fairchild Semiconductor, and became part of ON Semiconductor in 2016.

In 2015 Xsens introduced a new inertial sensor module by the name of the MTi 1-series and in 2019, the latest series of inertial sensor modules was introduced, called the MTi 600-series.

In 2017 both Xsens MVN and MVN BIOMECH were renamed to Xsens MVN Animate and Xsens MVN Analyze. In Nov 2017, mCube acquired Xsens from ON Semiconductor.

In January 2020 Xsens launched Xsens DOT development platform for the analysis and reporting of human kinematics.

In September 2021 mCube announced it is rebranding as Movella. Movella products serve four primary markets: entertainment, sports, health, and industrial. The new brand encapsulates the value and technologies from mCube, Xsens, and Kinduct.

In March 2023 Movella went public on NASDAQ and in April 2024 Movella voluntarily delisted from NASDAQ and listed on OTC Pink Market.

In December 2024 Xsens launched the Xsens Sirius

In March 2026 Movella rebranded back to Xsens.

== Products ==
Xsens product range from inertial sensors to inertial Motion Capture.

- Xsens MTi series
- Xsens Sirius series
- MTw Awinda
- Xsens MVN Analyze
- Xsens MVN Animate
- Movella DOT

== Software ==
Xsens develops proprietary software for their own inertial sensors and motion capture products.

- MT Software Suite for all MTi and Sirius sensors
- MT Software Suite for MTw Awinda
- Xsens Animate motion capture software for Entertainment
- Xsens Analyze motion capture software for Health & Sports

== Inertial sensor applications ==
Typically Xsens inertial sensor technology is used for orientation, attitude- and positioning data. The technology is integrated by:

- Fleet operators
- Robotics integrators
- Digital mapping companies (surveying, mapping)
- Drone developers
- Vehicle-testing
- Autonomous Vehicles
- Warehouse & Logistics (AGV/AMR)
- Maritime/offshore (ROVs/AUVs/USVs/floating platforms)
- Aerospace
- Heavy-Industry (harbor/construction/mining)
- Agriculture (UGVs/robots)
- Last Mile Delivery (LMD)

== Projects ==
Xsens participates in research projects like AnDy, a project funded by the European Union within the Horizon 2020 Research and Innovation Programme endowing robots with the ability to control physical collaboration through intentional interaction.

Xsens also participates in AWESCO, a Marie Skłodowska-Curie Initial Training Network funded by the European Union within the Horizon 2020 Framework Programme and by the Swiss federal government. The project aims to address the key challenges of airborne wind energy technologies with the aim of supporting the commercialization in Europe.

Since 2014, Xsens is a full partner of KNEEMO Initial Training Network (ITN) for knee osteoarthritis research funded through the European Commission’s Framework 7 Programme. As an industrial partner, its role is to develop methods to estimate knee joint loading using inertial motion capture.

Other projects are MC Impulse, focusing on sensor data processing and MILEPOST, on indoor navigation.

== Productions ==
Xsens products are widely known for use in film, game, live entertainment and advertising. Known productions that were created with the help of Xsens products are:

- Finch
- Baldur's Gate 3
- The Umbrella Academy
- The Mandalorian
- Stranger Things 3
- WestWorld season 3
- Avengers: Infinity War
- Black Panther
- Thor: Ragnarok
- Batman vs. Superman: Dawn of Justice
- Ant-Man
- FIFA 16
- Love Has No Labels
- Ted 1 and 2
- Just Cause 3
- Lyle, Lyle, Crocodile
