= Amorphous (disambiguation) =

An amorphous solid is a solid that lacks the long-range order that is characteristic of a crystal.

Amorphous may also refer to:

- Amorphous (album), an album by Icon For Hire
- Amorphous (DJ), the American music producer and disk jockey
- Amorphous computing
- An amorphous set in set theory

== See also ==
- Amorphous semiconductor (disambiguation)
