= KNEEMO Initial Training Network =

Knee osteoarthritis research

KNEEMO ITN
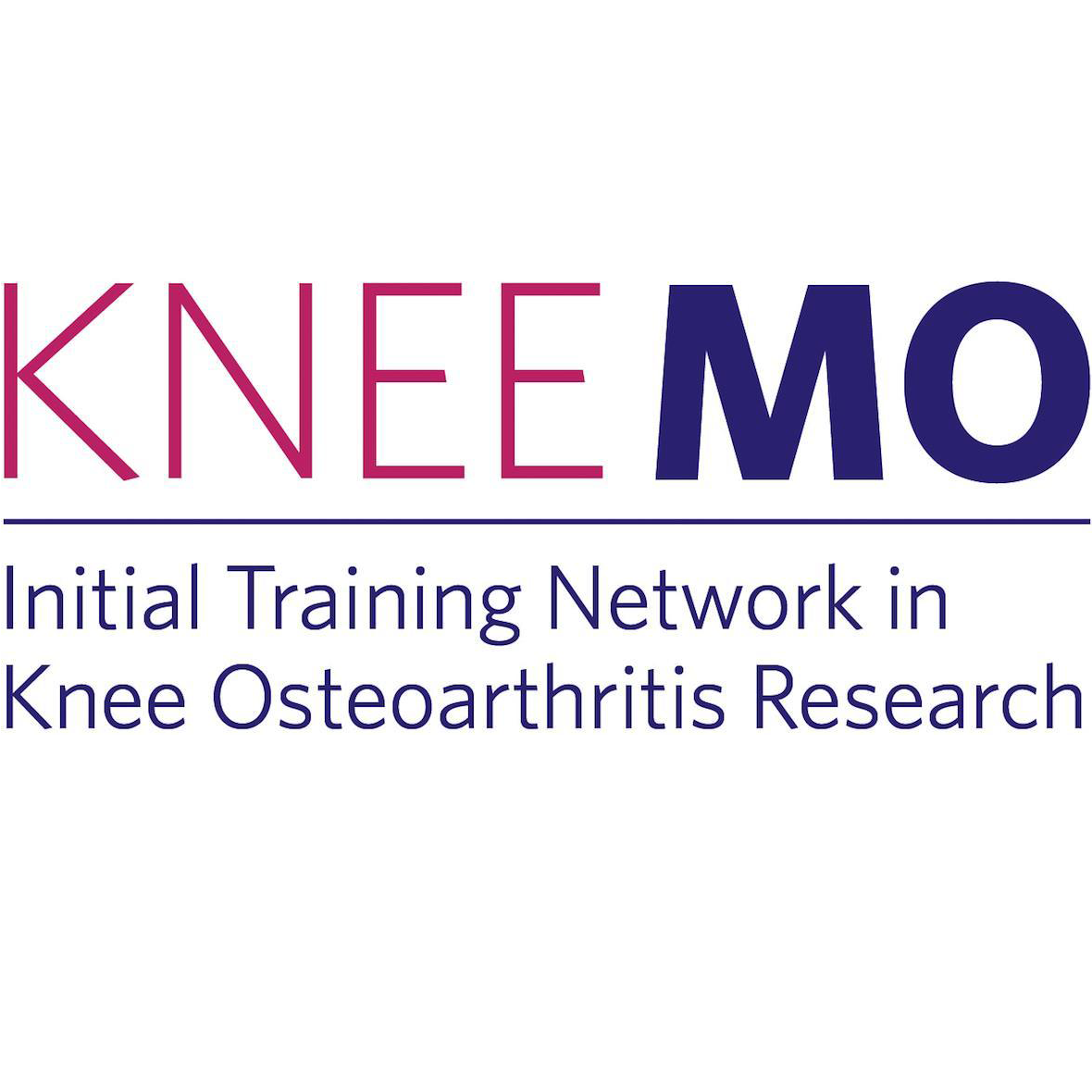
- Type of project: Initial Training Network
- Location: Glasgow, United Kingdom; Aalborg, Denmark; Amsterdam, Netherlands; Enschede, Netherlands; Münster, Germany; Newcastle upon Tyne, United Kingdom; Odense, Denmark; Salzburg, Austria
- Established: 2014
- Funding: EU-FP7, Grant Agreement Number 607510
- Status: In progress
- Website: http://www.kneemo.eu/

KNEEMO is a training network for knee osteoarthritis research, funded by the European Commission's Framework 7 Programme (FP7). KNEEMO includes 15 research projects for early career researchers who are employed at eight different host institutions across Europe.

A combination of existing best practices from the members of KNEEMO consortium is included in the training programme of the project. The aim of this programme is to enhance the skills of the researchers in both discipline and generic topics.

‌The project has received funding from the European Union's Seventh Framework Programme for research, technological development and demonstration under grant agreement no. 607510.

== KNEEMO Network ==
=== Full Partners ===
- Glasgow Caledonian University
- Aalborg University
- Paracelsus Private Medical University of Salzburg
- Peacocks medical group
- University of Münster
- University of Southern Denmark
- VU University Medical Center Amsterdam
- Xsens

=== Associated Partners ===
- AnyBody Technology
- Chondrometrics
- European Society for Movement Analysis in Adults and Children (ESMAC)
- Institute of Knowledge Transfer (IKT)
- Reade, center for rehabilitation and rheumatology
- University of Melbourne
- University of Twente

== Training Events ==
Event	Date	Host	Location
Workshop on disease burden and the epidemiology of osteoarthritis	Mar 2015	VU University Medical Center	Amsterdam, Netherlands
Summer School: Professional training, innovation and enterprise outreach	Aug 2015	Glasgow Caledonian University	Glasgow, United Kingdom
Workshop on knee osteoarthritis biomechanics	Feb 2016	University of Münster	Münster, Germany
Workshop on advanced computational modelling of the knee and knee joint structure	Sep 2016	University of Aalborg	Aalborg, Denmark
Workshop on non-pharmacological interventions for knee osteoarthritis	Mar 2017	University of Southern Denmark	Odense, Denmark
Workshop topic TBD	Dec 2017	Paracelsus Private Medical University of Salzburg	Salzburg, Austria
