= Hana Micron =

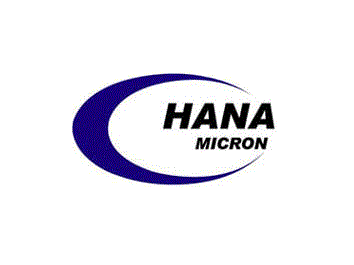
- Type: Public
- Traded as: KRX: 067310
- Industry: Semiconductor
- Founded: 2001
- Headquarters: Asan, South Korea
- Key people: Chang H. Choi
- Revenue: ▲US$260M (2011)
- Net income: ▲US$26M (2011)
- Total assets: ▲US$268M (2011)
- Total equity: ▲US$132M (2011)
- Number of employees: 1,300
- Website: hanamicron.com htmicron.com.br/en/

Hana Micron (KOSDAQ 067310) is a semiconductor company specializing in assembly and product packaging as well as test and module manufacturing services. Hana Micron was founded in 2001 and its headquarters is located in Asan City, South Korea. As of 2011, Hana Micron has over 1,300 employees and reported over $260 million in sales.

Hana Micron has offices around the world including the United States, Brazil, and China. Hana Micron's manufacturing factories are located in Brazil, South Korea and Vietnam.

In 2007, Hana Silicon was created as a subsidiary of Hana Micron. Hana Silicon provides consumable parts for the semiconductor etching process which is the silicon based cathode ring essential for manufacturing semiconductor products.

In 2008, Hana Micron America along with Hana Innosys were formed as a subsidiary of Hana Micron to concentrate on the SI (System Integration) business. Hana Innosys has developed a system integration solution for animal traceability by using RFID technology. In addition to the animal traceability solution, Hana Innosys has implemented a system integration solution for GPS fleet tracking systems.
