= Semiconductor industry =

Design and fabrication of semiconductors

The semiconductor industry is the aggregate of companies engaged in the design and fabrication of semiconductors and semiconductor devices, such as transistors and integrated circuits. Its roots can be traced to the invention of the transistor by Shockley, Brattain, and Bardeen at Bell Labs in 1948. Bell Labs licensed the technology for $25,000, and soon many companies, including Motorola (1952), Shockley Semiconductor (1955), Sylvania, Centralab, Fairchild Semiconductor and Texas Instruments were making transistors. In 1958 Jack Kilby of Texas Instruments and Robert Noyce of Fairchild independently invented the Integrated Circuit, a method of producing multiple transistors on a single "chip" of semiconductor material. This kicked off a number of rapid advances in fabrication technology leading to the exponential growth in semiconductor device production, known as Moore's law that has persisted over the past six or so decades. The industry's annual semiconductor sales revenue has since grown to over $481 billion, as of 2018.

In 2010, the semiconductor industry had the highest intensity of research and development in the EU and ranked second after Biotechnology in the EU, United States and Japan combined.

The semiconductor industry is in turn the driving force behind the wider electronics industry, with annual power electronics sales of £135 billion ($216 billion) as of 2011, annual consumer electronics sales expected to reach $2.9 trillion by 2020, tech industry sales expected to reach $5 trillion in 2019, and e-commerce with over $29 trillion in 2017. In 2019, 32.4% of the semiconductor market segment was for networks and communications devices.

In 2025, the sales of semiconductors reached a record $791.7 billion, up 25.6%, driven largely by demand for artificial intelligence hardware, according to the Semiconductor Industry Association. Sales of logic products were the largest product category, totaling $301.9 billion, followed by memory products at $223.1 billion. Regionally, annual sales grew most in Asia Pacific (45.0%), followed by the Americas (30.5%), China (17.3%), and Europe (6.3%), while sales in Japan declined 4.7%. The semiconductor industry is projected to reach roughly $1 trillion in sales in 2026.

== Industry structure ==
The global semiconductor industry is dominated by companies from the United States, Taiwan, South Korea, Japan and the Netherlands, with Israel and Germany having significant presence in the field.

Electronic integrated circuit export by country or region as of 2016, by HS4 trade classification

Export of discrete semiconductors as of 2016, by United Nations Harmonized Commodity Description and Coding Systems 4

Unique features of the industry include continuous growth but in a cyclical pattern with high market fluctuation over the short run. While the current 20-year annual average growth of the semiconductor industry is on the order of 13%, this has been accompanied by equally above-average market volatility, which can lead to significant if not dramatic cyclical swings. This has required the need for high degrees of flexibility and innovation in order to constantly adjust to the rapid pace of change in the market as many products embedding semiconductor devices often have a very short life cycle.

At the same time, the rate of constant price-performance improvement in the semiconductor industry is staggering. As a consequence, changes in the semiconductor market not only occur extremely rapidly but also anticipate changes in industries evolving at a slower pace. The semiconductor industry is widely recognized as a key driver and technology enabler for the whole electronics value chain.

Prior to the 1980s, the semiconductor industry was vertically integrated. Semiconductor companies both designed and manufactured chips in their own facilities. In many cases, this included inventing new processes, refining and purifying source chemicals and silicon wafers, and even manufacturing equipment, like furnaces, lithography tools and etchers. These companies also carried out the assembly and testing of their chips. Over time, many of these functions were outsourced, such that today semiconductor manufacturers rely on a complex supply chain to provide wafers, high-purity source chemicals, and processing equipment. Further, starting with LSI in 1969, the industry has seen the emergence of Fabless Semiconductor Companies that focus solely on chip design and rely on other companies to manufacture their designs. Initially, these other companies were integrated device manufacturers (IDMs), companies that also designed and manufactured their own products, and thus were often competitors of the Fabless companies. But, by the mid-1980's, TSMC and UMC emerged as foundries, specializing solely in the manufacture of other companies' designs.

Today, much of the industry is based on the foundry model, which consists of semiconductor fabrication plants (foundries) and integrated circuit design operations, each belonging to separate companies or subsidiaries. Some companies, known as integrated device manufacturers, both design and manufacture semiconductors. The foundry model has resulted in consolidation among foundries. As of 2021, only three firms are able to manufacture the most advanced semiconductors: TSMC of Taiwan, Samsung of South Korea, and Intel of the United States. Part of this is due to the high capital costs of building foundries. TSMC's latest factory, capable of fabricating 3 nm process semiconductors and completed in 2020, cost $19.5 billion.

Intel is considering outsourcing some production to TSMC. It currently can only produce 10 nm semiconductors, while TSMC and Samsung can both produce 5 nm. GlobalFoundries, an American-headquartered firm, uses a 12 nm process for its most advanced chips due to the rapidly increasing development costs of smaller process nodes.

== Semiconductor Companies by Country ==
Semiconductor Companies by country.
Country	Name	Manufacturer type	Hardware products
South Korea	Samsung Electronics	IDM	NAND flash memory, DRAM, CMOS sensor, RF transceivers, OLED display, SSD
South Korea	SK Hynix (Note: Formerly Hyundai Electronics.)	IDM	flash memory, DRAM, SSD, CMOS sensor
Taiwan	MediaTek	Fabless	SoC, chipset, CPU, GPU, DSP
Taiwan	UMC	Pure-play	
Taiwan	TSMC	Pure-play	

== Semiconductor sales ==
=== Sales revenue ===
Annual semiconductor sales (1987–2018)
Year	Revenue (nominal)	Revenue (inflation)	Ref.
2022	$601,694,000,000		
2021	$594,952,000,000		
2020	$466,237,000,000		
2019	$422,237,000,000		
2018	$481,090,000,000	$616,820,000,000	
2017	$420,390,000,000	$552,170,000,000	
2016	$345,850,000,000	$463,960,000,000	
2015	$335,170,000,000	$455,250,000,000	
2014	$335,840,000,000	$456,740,000,000	
2013	$305,580,000,000	$422,360,000,000	
2012	$291,560,000,000	$408,880,000,000	
2011	$299,520,000,000	$428,680,000,000	
2010	$298,320,000,000	$440,450,000,000	
2009	$226,310,000,000	$339,620,000,000	
2008	$280,000,000,000	$419,000,000,000	
2007	$255,600,000,000	$396,900,000,000	
2006	$247,700,000,000	$395,600,000,000	
2005	$227,000,000,000	$374,000,000,000	
2004	$213,000,000,000	$363,000,000,000	
2000	$204,000,000,000	$381,000,000,000	
1995	$144,000,000,000	$304,000,000,000	
1992	$60,000,000,000	$138,000,000,000	
1990	$51,000,000,000	$126,000,000,000	
1987	$33,000,000,000	$94,000,000,000	

2017 sales breakdown
Industry sector	Revenue	Market share	Ref.
Memory	$124 billion	30%	
Logic	$102.2 billion	25%	
Microprocessor	$63.9 billion	16%	
Power semiconductors	$36.8 billion	9%	
Total	$420.39 billion	100%	

2008 sales breakdown
Semiconductor type	Revenue	Market share	Ref.
Integrated circuit chip	$250 billion	89.3%	
Compound semiconductors	$20 billion	7.1%	
Power transistors	$10 billion	3.6%	
Total	$280 billion	100%	

=== Market share ===
Microprocessor market share (2022)
Industry sector	Market share
Computer and peripheral equipment	32.3%
Consumer electronics	21.2%
Telecommunications equipment	16.5%
Industrial electronics	14.3%
Defense and space industry	11.5%
Transportation technology	4.2%

== Largest companies ==
Largest semiconductor companies (annual semiconductor sales leaders)
Rank	2021	2020	2018	2017	2011	2006	2000	1995	1992	1990	1986	1985	1975
1	Samsung	Intel	Samsung	Samsung	Intel	Intel	Intel	Intel	NEC	NEC	NEC	NEC	TI
2	Intel	Samsung	Intel	Intel	Samsung	Samsung	Toshiba	NEC	Toshiba	Toshiba	Toshiba	TI	Motorola
3	SK Hynix	TSMC	SK Hynix	TSMC	TSMC	TI	NEC	Toshiba	Intel	Hitachi	Hitachi	Motorola	Philips
4	Micron	SK Hynix	TSMC	SK Hynix	TI	Toshiba	Samsung	Hitachi	Motorola	Intel	?	Hitachi	?
5	Qualcomm	Micron	Micron	Micron	Toshiba	ST	TI	Motorola	Hitachi	Motorola	?	Toshiba	?
6	Nvidia	Qualcomm	Broadcom	Broadcom	Renesas	Renesas	Motorola	Samsung	TI	Fujitsu	?	Fujitsu	?
7	Broadcom	Broadcom	Qualcomm	Qualcomm	Qualcomm	Hynix	ST	TI	?	Mitsubishi	?	Philips	?
8	TI	Nvidia	Toshiba	TI	ST	Freescale	Hitachi	IBM	Mitsubishi	TI	?	Intel	?
9	Mediatek	TI	TI	Toshiba	Hynix	NXP	Infineon	Mitsubishi	?	Philips	?	National	?
10	AMD	Infineon	Nvidia	Nvidia	Micron	NEC	Philips	Hyundai	?	Panasonic	?	Panasonic	?

Major semiconductor companies
Name	Country	Manufacturer type	Hardware products
Samsung Electronics	South Korea	IDM	NAND flash memory, DRAM, CMOS sensor, RF transceivers, OLED display, SSD
Intel	United States	IDM	x86-64 microprocessor, GPU, SSD, DRAM
TSMC	Taiwan	Pure-play	
SK Hynix (Note: Formerly Hyundai Electronics.)	South Korea	IDM	flash memory, DRAM, SSD, CMOS sensor
Micron (Note: Acquired Elpida Memory and Powerchip.)	United States	IDM	DRAM, NAND flash, SSD, NOR flash, Managed NAND, multichip packages
Qualcomm	United States	Fabless	RF module, digital signal processor, Snapdragon system on chip
Broadcom	United States	Fabless	Broadband/Wi-Fi/Bluetooth modems, Custom DSP & ARM CPUs
Kioxia (Note: Formerly Toshiba Memory.)	Japan	IDM	NAND flash memory, SSD
Texas Instruments (TI)	United States	IDM	Microcontroller, SoC, DSP, Amplifiers, data converters
Analog Devices (Note: Acquired Maxim Integrated.)	United States	IDM	Amplifiers, data converters, audio & video products, RF & microwave, sensors, MEMS
Qorvo	United States	IDM	RF module, filters, Amplifiers, PMIC
Microchip	United States	IDM	Microcontrollers and analog semiconductors
NXP	Netherlands	IDM	PMIC Media processor, MIFARE, LPC
MediaTek	Taiwan	Fabless	SoC, chipset, CPU, GPU, DSP
Infineon (Note: Acquired Cypress Semiconductor.)	Germany	IDM	Microcontrollers and power semiconductor devices
Bosch	Germany	IDM	
STMicroelectronics	France/Italy	IDM	ASIC, Microcontrollers
Sony	Japan	IDM	Active-pixel sensor, NAND flash memory
ARM	United Kingdom	Fabless	Instruction set architecture
AMD	United States	Fabless	x86-64 CPU, GPU, motherboard chipset, SDRAM
Nvidia	United States	Fabless	GPU
ON Semiconductor	United States	IDM	
UMC	Taiwan	Pure-play	
Apple	United States	Fabless	Apple silicon
IBM	United States	Fabless	IBM Power microprocessors, z/Architecture
Mitsubishi Electric	Japan	IDM	Power semiconductor devices
Tower Semiconductor	Israel	IDM	
Xilinx	United States	Fabless	programmable logic device
SMIC	China	Pure-play	
Wolfspeed	United States	IDM	SiC
Nordic Semiconductor	Norway	Fabless	Bluetooth, Wifi, Low Power Cellular
ScaleFlux	United States	Fabless	NVMe SSD, SoC

Notes:

- Pure-play foundries – They specialize in foundry services. They may or may not offer design services to third parties, as well as mask (photomask) making, semiconductor packaging and testing services, which can also be outsourced to other companies. An example is TSMC, which offers design, testing and packaging services, TCE photomasks, which offers only mask making services, and ChipMOS, which offers only packaging and testing services.
- IDMs (integrated device manufacturers) – They may or may not offer foundry services.
- Fabless suppliers – They do not offer foundry services. They may or may not offer design services to third parties.

== Device shipments ==
Semiconductor devices (est. million manufactured units)
Year	Optoelectronics	Sensor / Actuator	MOSFET
1960–2001	?	?	2,900,000,000,000,000
2002	23,164	1,654	2,900,000,000,000,000
2003	28,955	2,482	2,900,000,000,000,000
2004	38,056	3,310	2,900,000,000,000,000
2005	44,675	4,137	2,900,000,000,000,000
2006	55,429	4,137	2,900,000,000,000,000
2007	67,839	4,136	2,900,000,000,000,000
2008	76,939	4,964	2,900,000,000,000,000
2009	91,003	4,964	2,900,000,000,000,000
2010	97,622	6,619	2,900,000,000,000,000
2011	110,031	8,273	2,900,000,000,000,000
2012	129,886	11,583	2,900,000,000,000,000
2013	131,541	14,064	2,900,000,000,000,000
2014–2015	?	?	10,100,000,000,000,000
2016	217,200	17,376	10,100,000,000,000,000
2017–2018	?	?	10,100,000,000,000,000
1960–2018	1,112,340+	87,699+	13,000,000,000,000,000

=== Integrated circuits ===
Integrated circuit chips (est. million manufactured units)
Year	MOS memory	MPU / MCU	Analog	Logic	ASIC	ASSP	Total
1960–1991	?	15,000	?	?	?	?	350,000
1992	3,706	15,000	?	?	?	?	350,000
1993	4,060	15,000	?	?	?	?	350,000
1994	4,938	15,000	?	?	?	?	350,000
1995	6,092	15,000	?	?	?	?	350,000
1996	6,206	15,000	?	?	?	?	350,000
1997	7,155	?	?	?	?	?	60,100
1998–1999	?	?	?	?	?	?	?
2000	?	?	?	?	?	?	89,100
2001	?	?	?	?	?	?	?
2002	9,100	6,619	24,819	11,582	2,482	23,992	78,594
2003	10,755	6,618	30,611	14,064	1,655	25,646	89,349
2004	13,237	9,100	33,092	14,064	1,654	33,092	104,239
2005	15,719	8,273	37,229	14,891	2,481	38,056	116,649
2006	18,201	10,755	43,020	18,200	2,482	45,501	141,600
2007	23,992	12,409	48,811	18,201	3,309	45,502	156,000
2008	25,646	12,410	49,639	18,200	1,655	47,156	154,706
2009	28,128	11,582	43,020	14,892	2,482	43,847	143,951
2010	33,919	16,546	57,084	19,028	1,654	57,911	189,800
2011	33,919	17,374	56,256	19,028	1,655	58,738	186,970
2012	34,747	17,373	57,084	17,373	1,655	57,083	185,315
2013	33,919	16,546	67,839	18,201	2,481	64,530	203,516
2014	?	18,600	?	?	?	?	?
2015	?	22,058	?	?	?	?	235,600
2016	43,440	21,174	130,320	52,128	?	?	342,416
2017	?	25,797	?	?	?	?	581,321
2018	?	?	?	?	?	?	634,700
1960–2018	356,879+	274,298+	635,804+	249,852+	25,645+	541,054+	4,043,926+

=== Discrete devices ===
Discrete devices (est. million manufactured units)
Year	Discrete transistors			Diode	Total
Year	Power	Small-signal	Total	Diode	Total
1954–1956	?	?	28	?	28+
1957	?	?	30	?	30+
1958–1962	?	?	?	?	?
1963	?	?	303	?	303+
1964–1965	?	?	?	?	?
1966	?	?	968	?	968+
1967	?	?	881	?	881+
1968	?	?	997	?	997+
1969	?	?	1,249	?	1,249+
1970	?	?	914	?	914+
1971	?	?	881	?	881+
1972–2001	?	?	?	?	?
2002	?	?	?	?	232,472
2003	?	?	?	?	245,708
2004	?	?	?	?	287,901
2005	?	?	?	?	290,382
2006	?	?	?	?	321,820
2007	?	?	?	?	356,566
2008	?	?	?	?	324,301
2009	?	?	?	?	289,555
2010	53,000	?	53,000+	?	371,458
2011	45,000	110,000	155,000	143,000	356,000
2012	?	?	?	?	345,812
2013	44,000	103,000	147,000	146,000	358,000
2014	48,000	109,000	157,000	154,000	380,000
2015	52,000	107,000	159,000	150,000	372,000
2016	53,300	?	53,300+	?	382,272
2017	58,100	?	58,100+	?	58,100+
2018	62,800	?	62,800+	?	62,800+
1954–2018	416,200+	429,000+	851,451+	593,000+	5,041,398+

== Sales ==
Manufacturers headquartered in the following places are the sales leaders in the pure-play foundry, IDM (integrated device manufacturing), fabless manufacturing and OSAT (outsourced semiconductor assembly and testing) sectors of the industry.

Rank	Foundry	IDM	Fabless	OSAT
1	Taiwan	United States	United States	Taiwan
2	United States	South Korea	Taiwan	United States
3	China	Japan	China	China
4	South Korea	European Union	European Union	Singapore
5	Israel	Taiwan	Japan	Japan

Manufacturers headquartered in the United States have fabrication plants across the world, including over 50% in the Americas, 39% in the Asia-Pacific region (including 9% in Japan), and 9% in Europe.

== See also ==
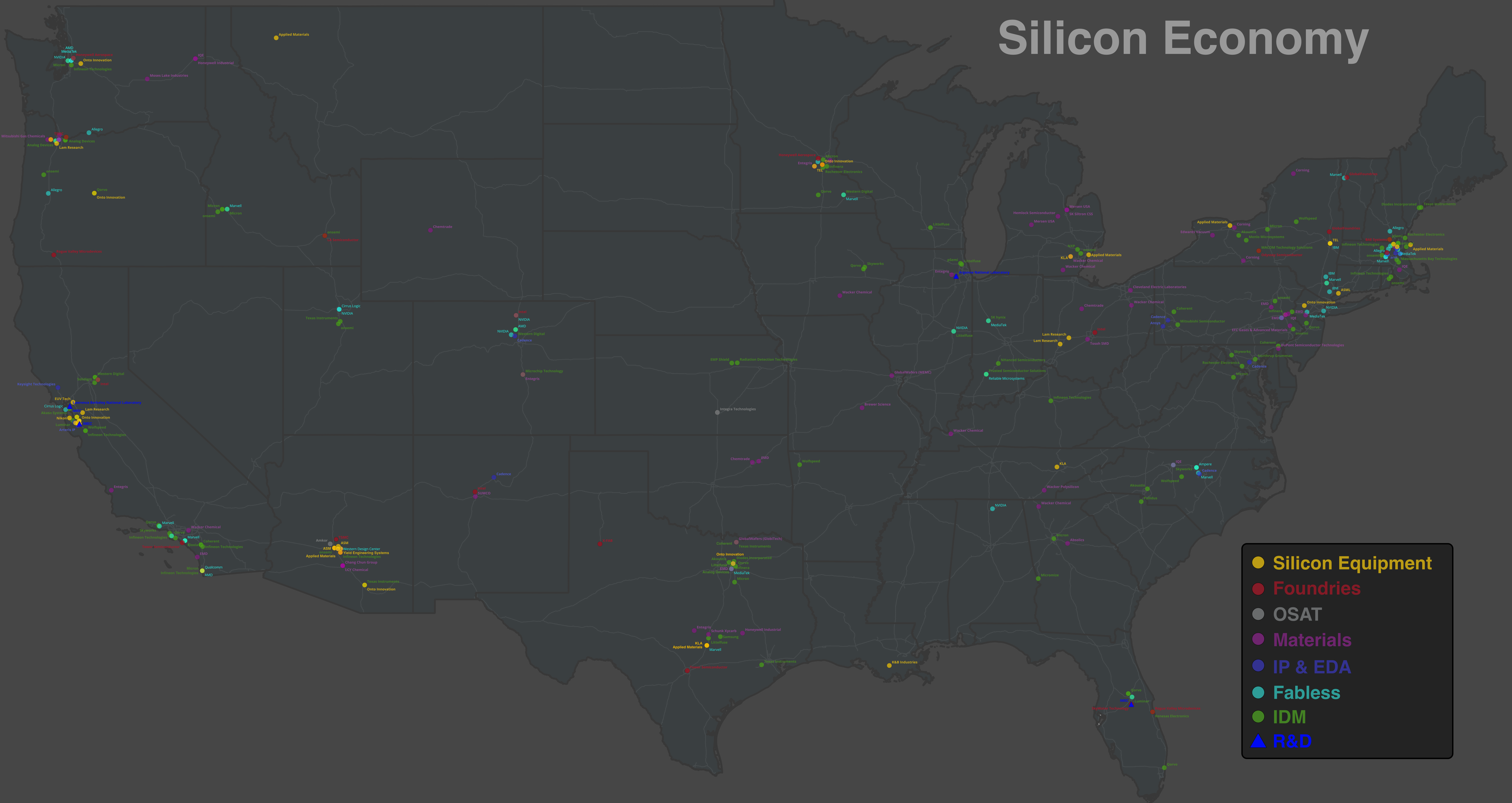
Semiconductor companies in the United States

- Electronic design automation
- Electronics and semiconductor manufacturing industry in India
- Electronics and semiconductor manufacturing industry in Japan
- List of EDA companies
- List of semiconductor fabrication plants
- List of semiconductor occupations
- Semiconductor consolidation
- Semiconductor device fabrication
- Semiconductor fabrication plant
- Semiconductor Industry Association
- Semiconductor industry in India
- Semiconductor industry in Japan
- Semiconductor industry in Taiwan
- Semiconductor industry in China
- Semiconductor industry in South Korea
- Semiconductor industry in the United States
- Transistor count
