= Orbit Semiconductor =

Semiconductor manufacturing company

Orbit Semiconductor, Inc.
- Type: Private
- Industry: Semiconductor
- Founded: Sunnyvale, California (1985)
- Founder: Gary P. Kennedy
- Headquarters: Sherman Oaks, California, United States
- Key people: Aran Idan (CEO & President)
- Website: www.orbit-semi.com

Orbit Semiconductor, Inc. manufactures semiconductors devices. The company designs electronic systems for application in the medical, telecommunication, consumer, aerospace, military and manufacturing sectors.

Orbit Semiconductor is a recognized and established player in FPGA to ASIC conversions and in ASIC to ASIC conversions. The company specializes in the low-cost, high-volume consumer market and the complementary low-to-medium volume communications, industrial, medical and military markets. It has proprietary gate-array technology delivering a flexible response at low cost.

== Company history ==
Orbit Semiconductor was founded in 1985 by Gary P. Kennedy in Sunnyvale, California. In 1991, Orbit Semiconductor underwent a management buy-out (MBO) by Gary P. Kennedy and his associates. In 1992, Orbit Semiconductor became a pioneer in the FPGA Conversion arena. Orbit Semiconductor successfully underwent an initial public offering (IPO) in 1994, trading as ORB on NASDAQ. In 1998, Orbit Semiconductor merged with DII Group, Inc., and in 2000, DII Group merged with Flextronics Semiconductor, Inc. In September 2005, AMI Semiconductor acquired the Semiconductor Division of Flextronics, Inc., and in February 2007, the Orbit team became independent.
