= Semiconductor industry in South Korea =

In South Korea, the semiconductor industry has continued to develop since the 1980s with efforts from both public and private sectors in expanding semiconductor infrastructures and growth. South Korea held a 17.7 percent share in the global semiconductor market in 2022, and continued to be the second largest in the world for the 10th consecutive year since 2013.

The country accounted for 60.5% of the global memory semiconductor market, with a DRAM market share of 70.5% and a NAND market share of 52.6%. South Korea is continuously focusing on R&D (research and development) and investment to maintain its competitive advantage. In addition, South Korea is pushing to expand its foundry market share based on ultra-fine processing technology. The country accounts for 17.3% of the global foundry market.

Central to this ascent are industry giants Samsung Electronics and SK Hynix, which have established South Korea as a dominant force in memory chip production. As of Q1 2025, SK Hynix led the global DRAM market with a 36% share, surpassing Samsung's 34% for the first time.

== Timeline ==
The history of Korea's semiconductor industry began in 1965.

- In 1983: South Korea became the third country in the world to develop 64K DRAM after the U.S. and Japan.
- In 1992: South Korea rose to the top of the DRAM market.
- In 2013: South Korea commercialized the world's first 3D V-NAND flash memory.

== Historical context ==
In the early stages of South Korea's semiconductor industry, the private sector took initiative in the investment and production of semiconductors. Manufacturers called for an intervention, as a result of a decline in government involvement. Samsung Electronics was one of the leaders in the development of semiconductor production and business. In 1978, the founder of the Samsung Group, Lee Byung-chul, established Samsung Semiconductor, before he continued to build the foundation of the semiconductor industry in South Korea. By the end of 1983, Samsung developed the 64K DRAM, and led South Korea to become the third country in the world to develop 64K DRAM, following Japan, who was the first in 1976, and then the U.S. in 1981.

== Domestic policy measures ==
South Korea passed the K-CHIPS Act in March 2023, which provides tax credits of up to 25% for facility investments and up to 50% for research and development. The legislation also streamlines government regulation to facilitate industry growth. Additionally, South Korea has continued to expand domestic semiconductor infrastructure, including plans to construct a large-scale semiconductor cluster near Seoul with substantial private-sector investment.

== Major companies ==
South Korea's semiconductor industry is dominated by several major companies that play a critical role in global supply chains, particularly in memory chip production and advanced fabrication technologies:

- DB HiTek
- DI Corporation
- Hana Micron
- Samsung Electronics
- SK Hynix
- Telechips

== Geopolitical context ==
Global NAND market share (2022)
1. South Korea (52.6%)
2. other countries (47.4%)

The semiconductor industry in South Korea has become increasingly important in the context of global geopolitical competition, particularly between the United States and China. South Korea plays a significant role in foundry manufacturing and produces about 37% of the world’s semiconductors smaller than 10 nanometers. semiconductor exports reached a record $15 billion in August 2025, an increase of nearly a third from 2024, contributing to total monthly exports of $58.4 billion

=== United States - South Korea Semiconductor Cooperation ===
As the United States has introduced a range of policy measures aimed at maintaining its technological lead in the semiconductor sector, bilateral cooperation has intensified between the United States and South Korea. In 2021, the two countries agreed to collaborate on semiconductor research and manufacturing. Samsung Electronics committed to a $17 billion investment in a fabrication plant in Texas, and SK Hynix announced a $15 billion investment in an advanced packaging and R&D facility in the United States. Samsung has since considered an additional $200 billion investment for future U.S.-based plants.

At the diplomatic level, both countries participate in the “Fab 4” alliance—an informal grouping of key East Asian semiconductor producers—and have established the U.S.–Korea Supply Chain and Commercial Dialogue, which addresses cooperation on critical technology sectors, including semiconductors.

== Production and exports ==
In 2022, semiconductors were South Korea's leading export, totaling $129 billion and making up nearly 19% of the nation's overall exports. The Statistics Korea released statistical data demonstrating that, from February 2023 to February 2024, semiconductor production increased 65.3%, which was the largest increase since the end of 2009. In addition to the semiconductor industry holding prominence within South Korea, the country leads globally in memory chip production, with Samsung Electronics and SK Hynix dominating the market, holding global market share of 73% for Dynamic Random-Access Memory (DRAM) chips and 51% for NAND flash.

However, in 2023, South Korea held approximately 13% of the global semiconductor market, reflecting a gradual decline from previous years. South Korea lacks sufficient domestic supply of critical resources such as silicon-grade quartz, other raw minerals and specialty metals, and energy sources. This has resulted in a greater reliance on imported resources to maintain South Korea's position in the semiconductor industry. Despite the limited natural resources, South Korea continues to invest heavily in semiconductor manufacturing, with the aim of Samsung and SK Hynix to significantly increase monthly wafer production to 7.1 million by 2030.

Most recently, due to increasing AI demand and stockpiling of chips ahead of potential U.S. tariff increases, SK Hynix reported a 158% increase in operating profit in the first quarter of 2025, driven by strong sales of high-bandwidth memory (HBM) chips. As a result, SK Hynix has overtaken Samsung Electronics to become the world's top DRAM chipmaker with a 36% market share. However, Kyu Hyun Kim, head of DRAM marketing at SK Hynix, cautioned that "demand uncertainty will increase because of tariff policy changes and other restrictions."

== Semiconductor clusters ==
Semiconductor clusters are industrial areas dedicated to the production, development, and distribution of semiconductors by concentrating efforts and facilities into a certain geographical region.

The South Korean government announced in January 2024 its plan to invest about $470 billion over the next 23 years to build the world's largest semiconductor cluster in a large production complex to be built in Gyeonggi Province, along with SK Hynix. South Korea aims to increase the self-sufficiency ratio of essential materials, parts, and equipment for chip production to 50% by 2030.

"If we complete the construction of the semiconductor mega cluster at an earlier date, we will achieve the world's leading competitiveness in the chip sector and provide quality jobs for young generations."

— Ahn Duk-geun, Minister of Trade, Industry and Energy

"We already possess world-class technological and production capabilities in several areas, such as memory chips and OLED displays. The government must firmly support the private sector's investment for further growth."

— Yoon Suk Yeol, President of South Korea

Gumi is another city that accommodates semiconductor clusters from Samsung Electronics and small and middle sized enterprises. SK Siltron also invest their factories and R&D centres in Gumi.

== See also ==
- Economy of South Korea
- List of semiconductor companies in the United States
- Manufacturing in South Korea
- Semiconductor industry in India
