= RF Micropower =

Semiconductor company in Phoenix, Arizona

- Company type: Private
- Industry: Semiconductors
- Founded: July 18, 2000
- Founder: Dr. Trevor Thornton
- Headquarters: Phoenix, Arizona, United States
- Products: Si-MESFETs, Discrete Power transistors, RF power amplifiers, Low-dropout regulators, PLLs for Medical Implant Communication Service Band
- Website: rfmicropower.com

RF Micropower is a fabless semiconductor company based in Phoenix, Arizona that sells and licenses the RFuP technology that was initially developed by SJT Micropower, Inc. The company's proprietary technology enables high voltage Si-MESFET transistors to be fabricated on commercial SOI CMOS processes without altering the native process or adding additional fabrication steps which allows high levels of monolithic integration. These power transistors can operate at voltages that are 20 times higher than the baseline CMOS transistors and at several Watts of power. The technology has been implemented in various integrated circuit solutions including RF power amplifiers and power regulation circuits. According to their website, they have demonstrated Si-MESFETs at the 350 nm, 250 nm, 150 nm, 45 nm and 32 nm process nodes. The smallest process node for MESFETs on any type of substrate is currently 32 nm.

== Acceptance of Si-MESFETs ==
Applications of RF Micropower's Si-MESFET (metal-semiconductor field-effect-transistor) technology in linear and switching regulators for radiation environments has been reported by the NASA Goddard Space Flight Center and was featured in the September 2011 and February 2013 Issues of NASA Tech Briefs. In Chapter 6 of the book Extreme Environment Electronics (edited by John D. Cressler and H. Alan Mantooth), Johnathan A. Pellish from NASA and Lewis M. Cohn from the Naval Research Laboratory state that MESFETs on SOI substrates are suitable for applications from -180 °C and 250 °C and have been demonstrated to operate through 5 Mrad of total ionizing dose. The Si-MESFETs and their corresponding applications were also featured prominently in Chapters 23 and 63 of the book. Most recently, results from the 45 nm process node were published in the book Frontiers in Electronics (edited by Sorin Cristoloveanu and Michael S. Shur).

== Origins ==
SJT Micropower, Inc was founded in 2000 by Dr. Trevor Thornton who has multiple patents in the field of MESFET fabrication and design. In 2013, SJT Micropower, Inc started doing business as RF Micropower. Dr. Thornton continues to serve as the company's president and is concurrently a professor in the School of Electrical, Computer and Energy Engineering at Arizona State University. Dr. Seth J. Wilk currently serves as the CEO.

From 2006 to 2012, the company was awarded a total of $2,782,727 through SBIR/STTR grants and as of 2012 has been published in 24 different peer-reviewed conference and journal proceedings.

== Locations ==
RF Micropower is headquartered in Phoenix, Arizona and has sales offices in Austin, Texas and Morristown, New Jersey.
