= List of solar engines =

Solar engines include:

- Crookes radiometer, a light mill composed of an airtight glass bulb containing a partial vacuum
- Solar engine, a circuit which stores energy from solar cells in a capacitor and releases it in pulses to animate toys
- Stirling engine, a heat engine of the external combustion piston engine type whose heat-exchange process allows for near-ideal efficiency in conversion of heat into mechanical movement
- Stellar engine, hypothetical megastructures that work on the scale of entire stars
