= GlobalWafers =

Taiwanese tech manufacturing company

GlobalWafers Co., Ltd.
- Company type: Public
- Traded as: TWSE: 6488
- ISIN: US37891E1038
- Industry: Electronics
- Founded: October 18, 2011; 14 years ago
- Headquarters: Hsinchu Science Park, Hsinchu, Taiwan
- Owner: Sino-American Silicon Products (SAS), 51%
- Website: www.sas-globalwafers.com

GlobalWafers Co., Ltd. (Chinese: 環球晶圓股份有限公司; pinyin: Huánqiú Jīngyuán Gǔfèn Yǒuxiàn Gōngsī) is a Taiwanese semiconductor company. As of 2022, they are the world's third largest silicon wafer supplier.

== History ==
GlobalWafers was spun off from Sino-American Silicon Products in 2011.

In December 2016, GlobalWafers completed its acquisition of SunEdison Semiconductor, which was later renamed to MEMC and remains a wholly owned subsidiary.

In 2018, Nikkei Asia reported on extensive talent poaching issues from China being faced by GlobalWafers.

In 2020, GlobalWafers announced their attempted acquisition of German silicon wafer supplier Siltronic. The deal fell apart 2022 when the German government failed to clear the deal by the required deadline. GlobalWafers later announced that they would be putting the more than US$3 billion earmarked for the acquisition towards capacity expansion.

On 11 March 2026, Globalwafers warned that prolonged disruptions to regional oil supplies or key materials due to the ongoing Middle East conflict could pose risks to the technology supply chain in the future.

== Operations ==
=== South Korea ===
GlobalWafers operates in South Korea under subsidiary MEMC Korea Co. A second fab opened in 2019.

=== United States ===
GlobalWafers opened a fab in Sherman, Texas in May 2025, billing it as the "new epicenter of semiconductor manufacturing in North America." It is the first of three planned fabs in Sherman.

In 2021, GlobalWafers also announced fabs to be built in Missouri as part of a partnership with GlobalFoundries.
