= Siltronic =

Silicon wafer manufacturer

Siltronic AG
- Formerly: Wacker-Chemitronic GmbH (1968-1994); Wacker Siltronic GmbH (1994-1996); Wacker Siltronic AG (1996-2004)
- Company type: Public (Aktiengesellschaft)
- Traded as: FWB: SHL; MDAX component
- ISIN: DE000WAF3001
- Industry: Electronics
- Founded: 1968; 58 years ago in Burghausen
- Headquarters: Munich, Germany
- Revenue: ▲€1.4 billion (2021)
- Operating income: ▲€316.9 million (2021)
- Net income: ▲€289.6 million (2021)
- Total assets: ▲€2.4 billion (2021)
- Total equity: ▲€1.3 billion (2021)
- Owner: Wacker Chemie AG (31%), GlobalWafers (13%)
- Number of employees: 4,117 (2021)
- Website: siltronic.com

Siltronic AG is a German manufacturer of wafers made of hyperpure silicon headquartered in Munich.

== History ==
In 1953, it all began in Burghausen Germany as Wacker Chemie was already researching and developing hyperpure silicon, which lead to the first semiconductor silicon to be produced in 1958. The number of employees were increased in 1961 as they began to add products, such as monocrystals, which were also distributed internationally. In 1965, Wacker acquired Monosilicon, a silicon producer in Los Angeles, USA.

The new wholly owned subsidiary company was founded in 1968 as Wacker-Chemitronic Gesellschaft für Elektronik-Grundstoffe mbH ("Wacker-Chemitronic") in Burghausen. In 1978, Wacker-Chemic built a plant in Portland, Oregon and founded the Wacker Siltronic Corporation. Workers were trained in Germany before the plants opening in 1980. In 1985, a joint venture for the production of 125 mm and 150 mm wafers began in Japan with NSC Electron Corporation. It changed its name to Wacker Siltronic GmbH in 1994. They then acquired the hyperpure silicon plant located in Freiberg, Germany in 1995, where the VEB Spurenmetalle Freiberg was integrated into Wacker Siltronic after the building was modernized. Initially 150 mm wafers were produced there, then later on the production of 200 mm wafers began. The company was renamed as a stock corporation (Wacker Siltronic AG) in 1996. In 1999, Wacker Siltronic Singapore Pte Ltd opened its 200 mm wafer production plant in Singapore.

In 2004, the company changed its name to Siltronic AG. The company manufactures silicon wafers with diameters of up to 300 mm at its two German production sites in Burghausen and Freiberg, as well as at sites in Asia and the USA. The company is a member of the Silicon Saxony association/industry association.

In 2006, it began a joint venture with Samsung named the Siltronic Samsung Wafer Pte Ltd, which was renamed to Siltronic Silicon Wafer Pte Ltd and together they constructed a 300 mm wafer production plant at the Singapore site, where the first wafer and ingots were produced in 2008.

In May 2015, Silitronic AG prepared its Initial Public Offering (IPO) in the regulated market of the Frankfurt Stock Exchange which was completed later that year.

In 2020, it was announced that Siltronic would be sold to Taiwanese manufacturer GlobalWafers, a subsidiary of Sino-American Silicon Products (SAS), for a good 3.7 billion euros. The offer was increased to around 4.4 billion euros in 2021. According to the two companies, the merger would create a leading supplier to the wafer industry with a comprehensive product portfolio and the ability to offer technologically advanced products to all semiconductor customers. Siltronic AG was in advanced discussions, nearing completion, regarding a takeover offer from GlobalWafers. But the deal did not receive regulatory approval on time. GlobalWafers already acquired SunEdison's semiconductor business in 2016.

In 2023, Siltronic reported results as outlined in its annual report and interim statements.

== Share and shareholder structure ==
The company's shares have been traded in the Prime Standard of the Frankfurt Stock Exchange since June 11, 2015, and were admitted to the TecDAX on December 21 of the same year. Prior to that, Siltronic was a wholly owned subsidiary of Wacker Chemie. Between September 24, 2018 and June 21, 2021, Siltronic was additionally listed in the MDAX, and since then in the SDAX.

The company's share capital is divided into 30 million no-par value shares. A share of 30.83%, which has been held by Wacker Chemie since March 2017, is considered a fixed ownership. The remaining 69.17% are considered free float. As of November 2021, the free float shareholders subject to reporting requirements include Sino-American Silicon Products Inc. (13.67%), Goldman Sachs (7.88%), and JP Morgan Chase (6.50%) as the largest shareholders.

== Production sites ==
- Burghausen, Germany
- Freiberg, Germany
- Portland, United States
- Singapore, Singapore

== Products ==
Siltronic AG sells silicon wafers with diameters from 200 mm to 300 mm (8 to 12 inches) with many different features such as:

- Crystal growth according to Czochralski method or Float Zone method
- Polished, epitaxial, as cut, lapped, etched surface
- Silicon wafers are offered with boron, phosphorus, antimony and arsenic doping.

Siltronic AG and Samsung Electronic of South Korea are partners in a joint venture to produce 300mm (12 inch) wafers in a factory in Singapore.
