= Biohybrid solar cell =

Solar cell containing organic and inorganic matter

A biohybrid solar cell is a solar cell made using a combination of organic matter (photosystem I) and inorganic matter. Biohybrid solar cells have been made by a team of researchers at Vanderbilt University. The team used the photosystem I (a photoactive protein complex located in the thylakoid membrane) to recreate the natural process of photosynthesis to obtain a greater efficiency in solar energy conversion. These biohybrid solar cells are a new type of renewable energy.

== Description ==
Multiple layers of photosystem I gather photonic energy, convert it into chemical energy and create a current that goes through the cell. The cell itself consists of many of the same non-organic materials that are found in other solar cells with the exception of the injected photosystem I complexes which are introduced and gathered for several days in the gold layer. After days the photosystem I are made visible and appear as a thin green film. It is this thin film that helps and improves the energy conversion. The biohybrid cell however, is still in the research phase.

== Research ==
The team from Vanderbilt University began conducting research on the photosynthesis when they began to see and focus on the photosystem I protein. After seeing how widely available and efficient the protein was at solar conversion they began to look to incorporate and improve different technologies. The team used spinach as their source for the photosystem I. Thylakoid membranes were isolated and then went into a purification process to separate the photosystem I from the thylakoid membrane. Their research resulted in a greatly improved electric current (1000 times greater) compared to those previous made by other solar cells. The team has been gathering a group of undergraduate engineers to help build the first prototype of the biohybrid solar cell. The team has also come up with a second design of the protein complex the photosystem II.

== Photovoltaic vs biohybrid ==
Comparing traditional photovoltaic cells and biohybrid solar cells is difficult. Both systems perform the same task converting into electricity the energy captured from the sun's rays. However, the method whereby each is done is completely different. The end result is also different: photovoltaic cells produce electric current whereas biomass or chemical fuels are produced in biohybrid cells because photosynthesis is involved in the process.

== Disadvantages ==
While the efficiency of the biohybrid cells are much greater they also have many disadvantages. In many cases some solar cells have some advantages over a biohybrid solar cell. For one, traditional solar cells produce more power than those currently being achieved by biohybrid cells. The lifespan of biohybrid solar cells is also really short, lasting from a few weeks to nine months. The durability of the cells prove to be an issue, compared to current solar cells can work for many years.
