= MCube =

Semiconductor company

mCube
- Industry: Semiconductor
- Founded: 2009
- Founder: Charles Young
- Headquarters: San Jose, California
- Key people: Ben Lee (CEO); Steve Smith (CFO); Vijay Nadkarni(CTO)
- Products: MEMS
- Website: https://www.movella.com/

mCube is a fabless semiconductor company founded in 2009 and headquartered in San Jose, California, and has offices at multiple locations in Hsinchu, Taipei, Shanghai, and Shenzhen. It manufactures microelectromechanical systems (MEMS) motion sensors.

== History ==
mCube was founded by Charles Yang and Kleiner Perkins Caufield & Byers in 2009. Led by Ben Lee, President and CEO, mCube is privately held and backed by venture and strategic partner investors including DAG Ventures, iD Ventures America, Keystone Ventures, Kleiner Perkins, Korea Investment Partners, MediaTek, and SK Telecom (China) Ventures, receiving $37M in its Series C round of funding in 2014.

In November 2017, mCube completed the acquisition of Xsens, a company that specializes in 3D motion tracking products and technology, from ON Semiconductor. Xsens products are used in industrial applications, such as autonomous vehicles, professional drones, smart farming, and robotics. Xsens has to retainers brand name and will continue to operate from its current base in Enschede, The Netherlands as a stand-alone business unit of mCube.

In 2018, mCube's MC3672 was selected as a CES Innovation Award Honoree in the Embedded Technologies category.

On 22 September 2020, mCube announced the acquisition of Kinduct, a Halifax, Nova Scotia based company that specializes in the management of health and athlete data. mCube was rebranded as Movella on 27 September 2021.

== Technology ==
Yole Développement confirmed mCube's monolithic single-chip MEMS+ASIC product as the world's smallest accelerometer in March 2014. With over 180 patents filed to date, mCube integrates a MEMS sensor with ASICs onto a single die using standard CMOS processes. This approach enables sensors to be easily manufactured and designed for a broad range of applications. Single-chip MEMS+ASIC devices are cost-effective, consume little power, and feature high performance. These advancements make it possible to place one or more motion sensors onto nearly any object or device. In some cases, these MEMS motion sensors can be embedded directly onto a device without requiring a package, which saves considerable cost and space. mCube motion sensors have been adopted in a range of smartphone and tablet reference designs and are featured on the approved vendor lists of leading chip-set partners.

== Products ==
mCube offers accelerometer, magnetometer, and software-based gyroscope products, of which some provide 9 degrees of freedom (DoF). As of 2019, mCube has shipped more than 500 million accelerometers. mCube’s monolithic MEMS accelerometers enjoy substantial size, cost, power, and performance advantages over the multi-chip modules from competing MEMS sensor manufacturers. mCube and Xsens are now jointly developing new system solutions aimed at existing and new customers in the consumer, industrial, medical, sports science, autonomous vehicle, and entertainment industries.
