= Amorphous semiconductor =

Amorphous semiconductor may refer to:

- Amorphous silicon (e.g. for thin-film PV)
- glassy forms of Arsenic sulfide
- glassy selenium
- glassy tellurium
- glassy Boron
- glassy Germanium
