= Dentsu Isobar =

Japanese advertising agency

Dentsu Isobar Inc.
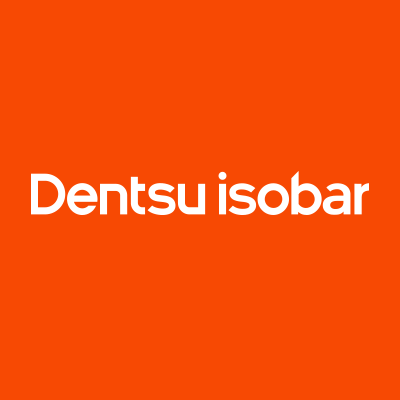
- Type: Subsidiary, KK
- Industry: Interactive Agency
- Founded: April 2, 2001
- Headquarters: Chuo, Tokyo, Japan
- Key people: Hidetoshi Tokumaru, President & CEO
- Products: Advertising
- Number of employees: 540
- Parent: Dentsu (Dentsu Aegis Network)
- Website: isobar.com

Dentsu Isobar Inc. (電通アイソバー, Dentsu Isobar Inc.) is an interactive agency based in Chuo-ku, Tokyo, Japan. It was established in 2001.

== History ==
Digital Palette Logo 2001-2007

Dentsu Avenue A Razorfish Logo 2007-2008

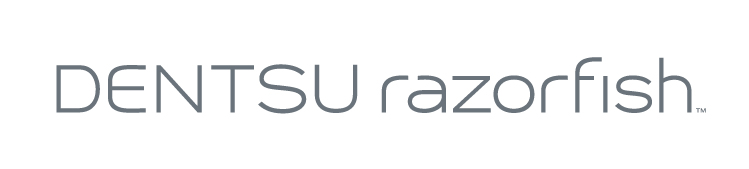
Dentsu Razorfish Logo 2008-2015

Dentsu ix Logo 2015

In April 2001, Digital Palette Inc. the predecessor of Dentsu Isobar established as a joint venture among Dentsu group, Fuji Xerox, Dai Nippon Printing, Toppan Printing and Kyodo Printing. Reo Watanabe became the first president and CEO. The company started offering integrated management service for digital communication contents.

The company began D-Pro(Digital Professional Service), the on-site stationed services including web production and on-demand printing and moved its head office to Tsukiji 5–6–10, Chuo-Ku, Tokyo in December 2002. One year later, in March 2003, the company is certified as BS7799 (currently known as ISO/IEC27001) compliant, and with ISO14001 compliant in the March 2004. In April 2005, the company merged with R2 Innovation and opens the Kansai office. Later, it formed a business and capital alliance with uhero group in October 2005. and formed business alliance with Cyber Communications Inc in July 2006.

In April 2005, the West Japan Office in Osaka was opened.

In January 2007, the company formed a business and capital alliance with Avenue A | Razorfish (currently known as Razorfish). This resulted in a name change from Digital Palette Inc., to Dentsu | Avenue A | Razorfish in February 2007. Later in the year, the company strengthened capital ties with cyber communications inc in July and opens Tokyo Satellite Office in August.

In January 2008, Dentsu | Avenue A | Razorfish renamed to Dentsu Razorfish, and in the following year in November 2009, Hidetoshi Tokumaru became the president and CEO. The company integrated its Tokyo Satellite Office into the head office in August 2010.

In July 2015, Dentsu Digital Holdings Inc (DDH), a wholly owned subsidiary of Dentsu Inc., acquired the shares formerly held by Publicis Groupe, and the company became a wholly owned subsidiary of DDH and rebranded as "Dentsu iX Inc."

After only 6 months under the new brand, the company announced a merger with Isobar Japan, and on January 1, 2016, the merger took place and the new company rebranded as Dentsu Isobar. Today, the company retains former Dentsu iX's office in Tsukiji as well as former Isobar Japan's office in Hamarikyu, and the West Japan Office in Osaka. As part of Isobar, Dentsu Isobar is part of the Dentsu Aegis Network. The current CEO and President of Dentsu Isobar is Hidetoshi Tokumaru.

== Operations ==
The company offers stuff including strategic planning, web production, creative planning, system development, and consulting services utilising digital technologies and consolidated marketing solutions in owned, paid and earned media.

=== Organisation ===
Dentsu Isobar collaborates with Dentsu Aegis Network's subsidiaries in Japan as well as overseas, and Isobar's global network includes over 70 locations across 45 markets.

=== Services ===
The company claimed expertise is in digital and social media in particular, Facebook marketing in Japan. As part of the Dentsu Group, the company has strong ties with Dentu's Business Intelligence Solutions Division.

== Tsukiji Shochiku Building ==
One of The Tokyo office is located on the 4th floor of the Tsukiji Shochiku Building, located between Tsukiji and Higashi Ginza.

== See also ==
- Dentsu
- Dentsu Aegis Network
