= WFE =

WFE may refer to:

- World Federation of Exchanges, in finance (formed 1961)
- Wavefront error; see Adaptive optics
- Wafer fabrication equipment
- Wii Family Edition, a 2011 Nintendo game console
