= Wafer fabrication equipment =

Wafer fabrication equipment is equipment that is used in the process of semiconductor fabrication to process raw semiconductor wafers into finished chips, such as integrated circuits.

Wafer fabrication equipment is meant to be installed in cleanrooms.

== Types ==
- Stepper
- Burn-in oven

== Market ==
Referred to respectively as the wafer fab equipment or wafer front end (equipment) market, both using the acronym WFE, the market is that of the manufacturers of the machines which in turn manufacture semiconductors. The apexresearch link in 2020 identified Applied Materials, ASML, KLA, Lam Research, TEL and Dainippon Screen Manufacturing as market participants while the 2019 electronicsweekly.com report, citing The Information Network's president Robert Castellano, focused on the respective market shares commanded by the two leaders, Applied Materials and ASML.

== See also ==
- LCD manufacturing
- FOUP
