= Stepper =

Photolithographic Tool

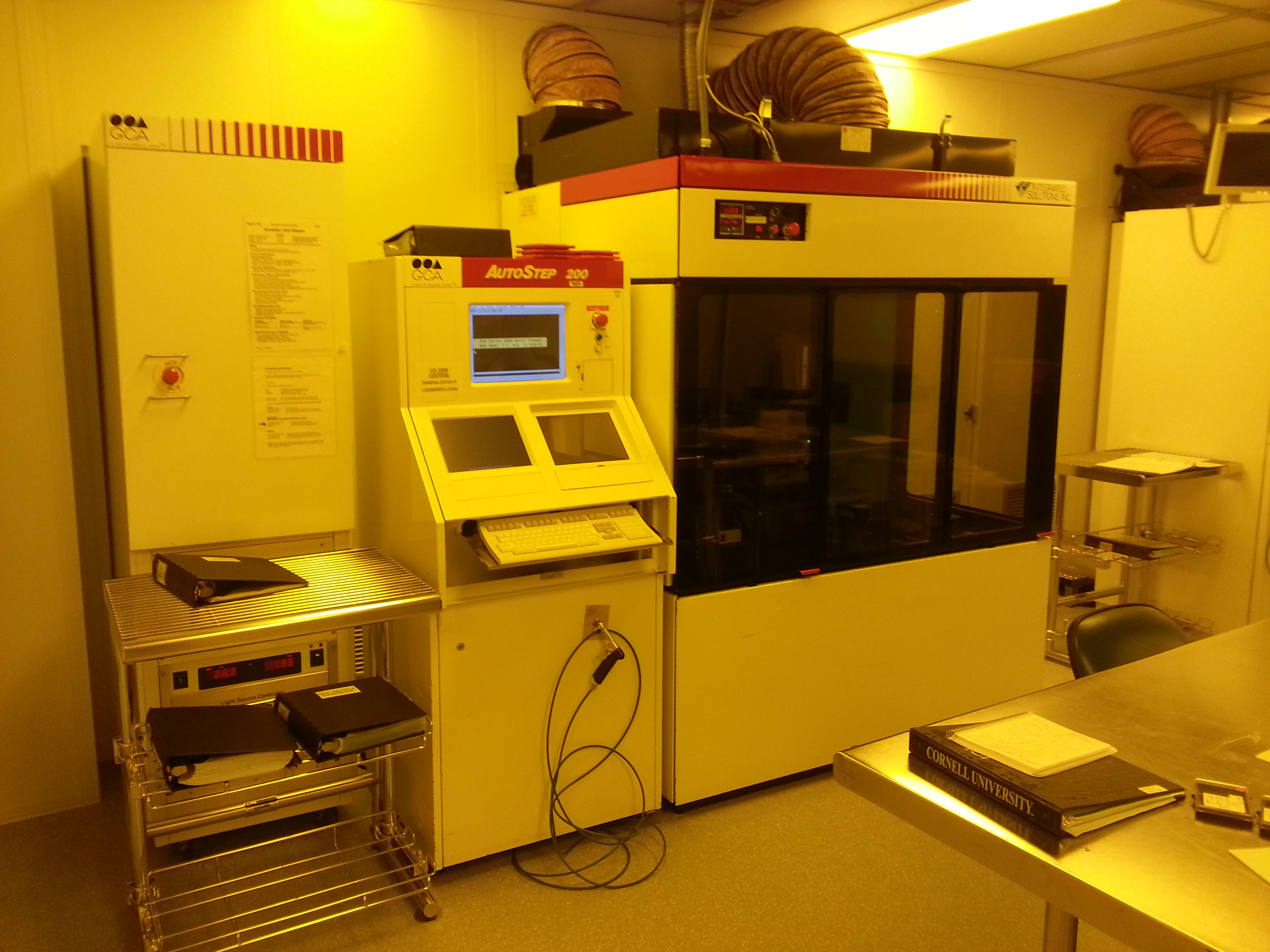
An i-line stepper at Cornell NanoScale Science and Technology Facility. (Photo taken under inactinic light.)

A stepper or wafer stepper is a device used in the manufacture of integrated circuits (ICs). It is an essential part of the process of photolithography, which creates millions of microscopic circuit elements on the surface of silicon wafers out of which chips are made. It is similar in operation to a slide projector or a photographic enlarger. The ICs that are made form the heart of computer processors, memory chips, and many other electronic devices.

Stepper is short for step-and-repeat camera.

The stepper emerged in the late 1970s but did not become widespread until the 1980s. This was because it was replacing an earlier technology, the mask aligner. Aligners imaged the entire surface of a wafer at the same time, producing many chips in a single operation. In contrast, the stepper imaged only one chip at a time, and was thus much slower to operate. The stepper eventually displaced the aligner when the relentless forces of Moore's Law demanded that smaller feature sizes be used. Because the stepper imaged only one chip at a time it offered higher resolution and was the first technology to exceed the 1 micron limit. The addition of auto-alignment systems reduced the setup time needed to image multiple ICs, and by the late 1980s, the stepper had almost entirely replaced the aligner in the high-end market.

The stepper was itself replaced by the step-and-scan systems (scanners) which offered an additional order of magnitude resolution advance. Step-and-scan systems work by scanning only a small portion of the mask for an individual IC, and thus require much longer operation times than the original steppers. Step-and-scan systems became widespread during the 1990s and essentially universal by the 2000s. Today, step-and-scan systems are so widespread that they are often simply referred to as steppers. An example of a step-and-scan system is the PAS 5500 from ASML.

== History ==
1957: Attempts to miniaturize electronic circuits started back in 1957 when Jay Lathrop and James Nall of the U.S. Army's Diamond Ordnance Fuze Laboratories were granted a US2890395A patent for a photolithographic technique that could be used to deposit thin-film metal strips that in turn used to connect discrete transistors on a ceramic plate. It was also used to etch holes in the silicon dioxide (SiO_{2}) layers to microfabricate diode arrays. Later, in 1959, Lathrop went to Texas Instruments, working for Jack Kilby, and Nall joined Fairchild Semiconductor.

1958: Based on their works, Jay Last and Robert Noyce at Fairchild Semiconductor built one of the first «step-and-repeat» cameras that repeated identical patterns of the transistors on a single wafer using photolithography.

1959: (Or no later 1961); The David W. Mann division of GCA Corporation became the first company to make commercial step and repeat mask reduction devices called photo-repeaters, which were the predecessors of modern day photolithography steppers. The company was later sold to GCA Corporation/Mann and Perkin Elmer.

1970: the Cobilt company was founded by a group of three engineers from Germany and England (from Kasper Instruments), and one salesman Peter Wolken. The company made what would later be called wafer steppers or lithography machines, at the time referred as mask aligners. (Note: According to an oral evidence by Peter Wolken the company wasn't founded by him, but by a three engineers whom he joined in Silicon Valley in early 1970s.) The throughput of this machine was one 2-Inches wide wafer at a time.

The Cobilt, which also traded abroad and had plants in Hong-Kong, in Europe was originally represented by a company called Advanced Semiconductor Materials (ASM) run by Arthur del Prado in Holland, who have founded the ASML in the mid of 1960s.

Around 1971 or so the Cobilt was acquired by Computervision, which had greatly automated Cobilt machine.

1973: Perkin-Elmer had introduced Micralign projection aligner. It helped to decrease amount of defective chips that resulted in low yields and greatly boosted IC industry by helping to lower prices on chips.

GCA introduced the first successful stepper, the DSW 4800, in 1975. It could reach critical dimensions of 1 micron, better than any other system at the time.

== The stepper's role in photolithography ==
Integrated circuits (ICs) are produced in a process known as photolithography. The process starts with a large highly purified cylindrical crystal of the semiconductor material known as a boule. Thin slices are cut off the boule to form disks, and then undergo initial processing and treatment to create a blank silicon wafer.

Elements of the circuit to be created on the IC are reproduced in a pattern of transparent and opaque areas on the surface of a glass or plastic plate called a photomask or reticle. The wafer is coated with a photosensitive material called photoresist. The mask is positioned over the wafer and bright light, normally ultraviolet, is shone through the mask. Exposure to the light causes sections of the resist to either harden or soften, depending on the process.

After exposure, the wafer is developed like photographic film, causing the photoresist to dissolve in certain areas according to the amount of light the areas received during exposure. These areas of photoresist and no photoresist reproduce the pattern on the reticle. The developed wafer is then exposed to solvents. The solvent etches away the silicon in the parts of the wafer that are no longer protected by the photoresist coating. Other chemicals are used to change the electrical characteristics of the silicon in the bare areas.

The wafer is then cleaned, recoated with photoresist, then passed through the process again in a process that creates the circuit on the silicon, layer by layer. Once the entire process is complete, the wafer is sawn apart into individual chips, tested, and packaged for sale.

=== Aligners vs. steppers ===
Before steppers, wafers were exposed using mask aligners, which patterned the entire wafer at once. Masks for these systems would contain many individual ICs patterned across the mask. Between each step, the operator would use a microscope to align the wafer with the next mask to be applied. During the 1970s, aligners generally worked at a one-to-one magnification, which limited the amount of detail on the wafer to about whatever could be produced on the mask.

As feature sizes shrank, following Moore's law, the construction of these complex multi-chip masks became very difficult. In 1975, GCA introduced the first step-and-scan camera, which simplified the process of making masks. In this system, a single parent mask, known as the reticle, was produced at large scale so it could be mechanically robust. This was imaged through a photographic projector, shrinking the projected image 5 to 10 times. The mechanism imaged the reticle onto a photographic plate, moved the reticle to another position, and repeated this process. The result was a mask containing many precise images of the original reticle pattern.

GCA continued development of the hardware as a direct-to-wafer system, eliminating the need to produce a mask from the reticle and instead using the reticle to expose the wafer directly. Because the reticle was at a much larger scale than the final image, the resolution could be improved, as this was formerly limited to the resolution of the mask itself. To pattern the entire wafer, the mask is repeatedly moved, or stepped, across the surface of the wafer. This requires the stepping mechanism to be incredibly accurate, demanding precise alignment. The alignment process is normally automated, eliminating manual operation. As each exposure takes as long as the entire mask in an aligner, steppers are inherently slower to use than aligners, so aligners remain in use for roles where higher resolutions are not required.

Steppers increased the possible resolution many times over that of the aligners and were the first systems to allow features smaller than 1 micron. However, the relentless drive of Moore's law pushed the industry to the point where even the maximum magnifications possible in the projection system were not enough to continue shrinking the feature sizes. This led to the 1990 introduction of the step-and-scan systems, which combine a stepper system with a scanner that images only a portion of the mask at a time. Doing so allows much better focus over the tiny part of the mask, although it also makes the IC production process much slower. As of 2008, step-and-scan systems are the most widely used systems for high-end semiconductor device fabrication.

== Major subassemblies ==
A typical stepper has the following subassemblies: wafer loader, wafer stage, wafer alignment system, reticle loader, reticle stage, reticle alignment system, reduction lens, and illumination system. Process programs for each layer printed on the wafer are executed by a control system centering on a computer that stores the process program, reads it, and communicates with the various subassemblies of the stepper in carrying out the program's instructions. The components of the stepper are contained in a sealed chamber that is maintained at a precise temperature to prevent distortions in the printed patterns that might be caused by expansion or contraction of the wafer due to temperature variations. The chamber also contains other systems that support the process, such as air conditioning, power supplies, control boards for the various electrical components, and others.

== Basic operation ==
The silicon wafers are coated with photoresist, and placed in a cassette or "boat" that holds a number of wafers. This is then placed in a part of the stepper called the wafer loader, usually located at the lower front of the stepper.

A robot in the wafer loader picks up one of the wafers from the cassette and loads it onto the wafer stage where it is aligned to enable another, finer alignment process that will occur later on.

The pattern of the circuitry for each chip is contained in a pattern etched in chrome on the reticle, which is a plate of transparent quartz. A typical reticle used in steppers is 6 inches square and has a usable area of 104mm by 132mm.

A variety of reticles, each appropriate for one stage in the process, are contained in a rack in the reticle loader, usually located at the upper front of the stepper. Before the wafer is exposed a reticle is loaded onto the reticle stage by a robot, where it is also very precisely aligned. Since the same reticle can be used to expose many wafers, it is loaded once before a series of wafers is exposed, and is realigned periodically.

Once the wafer and reticle are in place and aligned, the wafer stage, which is moved very precisely in the X and Y directions (front to back and left to right) by worm screws or linear motors, carries the wafer so that the first of the many patterns (or "shots") to be exposed on it is located below the lens, directly under the reticle.

Although the wafer is aligned after it is placed on the wafer stage, this alignment is not sufficient to ensure that the layer of circuitry to be printed onto the wafer exactly overlays previous layers already there. Therefore, each shot is aligned using special alignment marks that are located in the pattern for each final IC chip. Once this fine alignment is completed, the shot is exposed by light from the stepper's illumination system that passes through the reticle, through a reduction lens, and on to the surface of the wafer. A process program or "recipe" determines the length of the exposure, the reticle used, as well as other factors that affect the exposure.

Each shot located in a grid pattern on the wafer and is exposed in turn as the wafer is stepped back and forth under the lens. When all shots on the wafer are exposed, the wafer is unloaded by the wafer loader robot, and another wafer takes its place on the stage. The exposed wafer is eventually moved to a developer where the photoresist on its surface is exposed to developing chemicals that wash away areas of the photoresist, based on whether or not they were exposed to the light passing through the reticle. The developed surface is then subjected to other processes of photolithography.

== Illumination and the challenges of improving resolution ==
The greatest limitation on the ability to produce increasingly finer lines on the surface of the wafer has been the wavelength of the light used in the exposure system. As the required lines have become narrower and narrower, illumination sources producing light with progressively shorter wavelengths have been put into service in steppers and scanners. An alternative to conventional light based lithography is nanoimprint lithography.

The ability of an exposure system, such as a stepper, to resolve narrow lines is limited by the wavelength of the light used for illumination, the ability of the lens to capture light (or actually orders of diffraction) coming at increasingly wider angles (called numerical aperture or N.A.), and various improvements in the process itself. This is expressed by the following equation:

$\mathrm{CD}=k_1\frac{\lambda}{\mathrm{NA}}$

$\mathrm{CD}$ is the critical dimension, or finest line resolvable, $k_1$ is a coefficient expressing process-related factors, $\lambda$ is the wavelength of the light, and $\mathrm{NA}$ is the numerical aperture. Decreasing the wavelength of the light in the illumination system increases the resolving power of the stepper.

Twenty years ago, the "g-line" (436 nm) of the mercury spectrum was used to create lines in the 750 nm range in steppers that employed mercury lamps as their illumination source. Several years later systems employing the ultraviolet "i-line" (365 nm) from mercury lamps were introduced to create lines as low as 350 nm. As the desired line widths approached and eventually became narrower than the wavelength of the light used to create them, a variety of resolution enhancement techniques were developed to make this possible, such as phase shifting reticles and various techniques for manipulating the angles of the exposure light in order to maximize the resolving power of the lens.

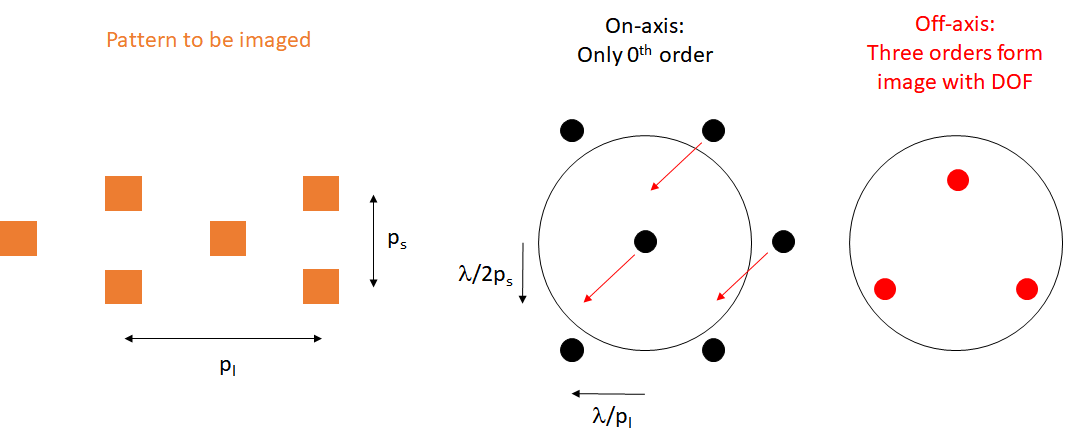
Off-axis illumination as a resolution enabler.

Eventually however, the desired line widths became narrower than what was possible using mercury lamps, and near the middle of the 2000s, the semiconductor industry moved towards steppers that employed krypton-fluoride (KrF) excimer lasers producing 248 nm light. Such systems are currently being used to produce lines in the 110 nm range. Lines as low as 32 nm are being resolved by production-capable steppers using argon-fluoride (ArF) excimer lasers that emit light with a wavelength of 193 nm. Although fluoride (F2) lasers are available that produce 157 nm light, they are not practical because of their low power and because they quickly degrade photoresist and other materials used in the stepper.

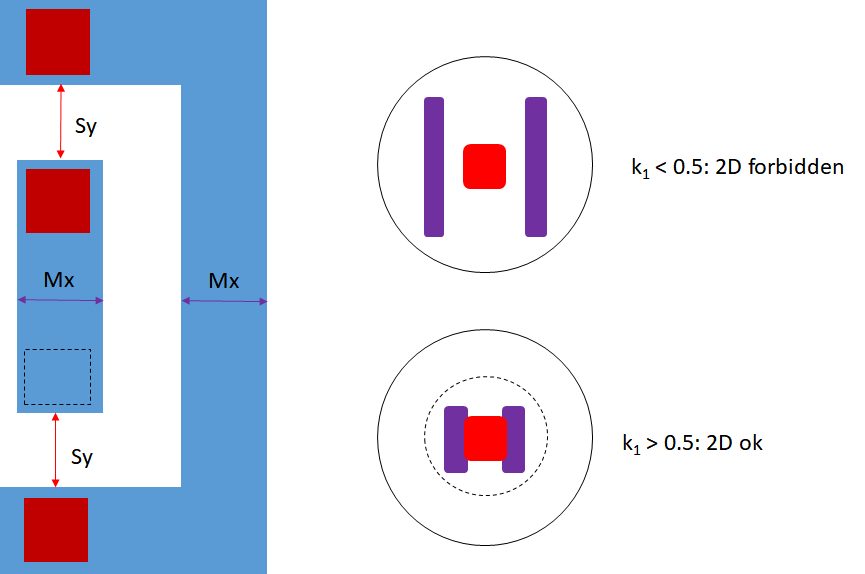
Optimum illumination dependence on pattern. The optimum illumination for a given pattern depends on the pattern. For an arbitrary 2D pattern, conventional illumination is sufficient for $k_1>0.5$. However, for $k_1<0.5$, the illumination is restricted per pattern.

Since practical light sources with wavelengths narrower than these lasers have not been available, manufacturers have sought to improve resolution by reducing the process coefficient $k_1$. This is done by further improving techniques for manipulating the light as it passes through the illumination system and the reticle, as well as improving techniques for processing the wafer before and after exposure. Manufacturers have also introduced ever larger and more expensive lenses as a means of increasing the numerical aperture. However, these techniques are approaching their practical limit, and line widths in the 45 nm range appear to be near the best that can be achieved with conventional design.

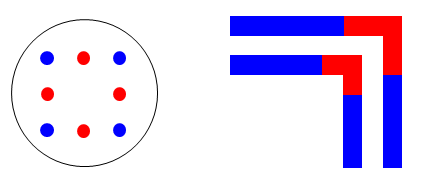
Restricted pupil locations. As the resolution limit is approached, specific locations of the pupil, corresponding to specific illumination angles for specific patterns (with corresponding colors), are forbidden for other patterns. For example, diagonal and horizontal+vertical pitches are mutually exclusive.

Ultimately, other sources of illumination will have to be put to use, such as electron beams, x-rays or similar sources of electromagnetic energy with wavelengths much shorter than visible light. However, in order to delay as long as possible the vast expense and difficulty of adopting a whole new type of illumination technology, manufacturers have turned to a technique, previously used in microscopes, for increasing the numerical aperture of the lens by allowing the light to pass through water instead of air. This method, called immersion lithography, is the current cutting edge of practical production technology. It works because numerical aperture is a function of the maximum angle of light that can enter the lens and the refractive index of the medium through which the light passes. When water is employed as the medium, it greatly increases numerical aperture, since it has a refractive index of 1.44 at 193 nm, while air has an index of 1.0003. Current production machines employing this technology are capable of resolving lines in the 32 nm range, and may eventually be able to achieve lines of 30 nm.

== Scanners ==
Modern scanners are steppers that increase the length of the area exposed in each shot (the exposure field) by moving the reticle stage and wafer stage in opposite directions to each other during the exposure. Instead of exposing the entire field at once, the exposure is made through an "exposure slit" that is as wide as the exposure field, but only a fraction of its length (such as a 9x25 mm slit for a 35x25 mm field). The image from the exposure slit is scanned across the exposure area.

An animation that shows how a scanner exposes sections of a wafer

There are several benefits to this technique. The field can be exposed with a lesser reduction of size from the reticle to the wafer (such as 4x reduction on a scanner, compared with 5x reduction on a stepper), while allowing a field size much larger than that which can be exposed with a typical stepper. Also the optical properties of the projection lens can be optimized in the area through which the image of the projection slit passes, while optical aberrations can be ignored outside of this area, because they will not affect the exposed area on the wafer.

Successful scanning requires extremely precise synchronization between the moving reticle and wafer stages during the exposure. Accomplishing this presents many technological challenges.

== See also ==
- Stepping level
- Photolithography
- Extreme ultraviolet lithography
- Semiconductor
- Integrated circuit

Stepper makers:

- ASML
- Ultratech
- Nikon, Precision division
- Canon
- Ushio, Inc.
- Rudolph Technologies
- SUSS MicroTec
- MAPPER LLC.
