= Aligner =

Aligner may refer to

- Aligner (semiconductor) - a technology used in photoresist creation for creating integrated circuits
- Clear aligners - an orthodontic tool
