= Mask aligner =

Mask aligner may refer to:

- Clear aligners, transparent dental braces.
- Aligner (semiconductor), a system used to project photomasks in photolithography.
