= Micralign =

Tool used in semiconductor fabrication

The Micralign was a family of aligners introduced in 1973 by Perkin-Elmer. Micralign was the first projection aligner, a concept that dramatically lowered semiconductor fabrication costs. According to the Chip History Center, it "literally made the modern IC [integrated circuit] industry".

The Micralign addressed a significant problem in the early integrated circuit (IC) industry: the vast majority of ICs printed contained defects that rendered them useless. On average, about 1 in 10 complex ICs produced would be operational, a 10% yield. The Micralign improved this to over 50%, and as great as 70% in many applications. In doing so, the price of microprocessors and dynamic RAM products fell about 10 times between 1974 and 1978, by which time the Micralign had become practically universal in the high-end market.

Initially predicting to sell perhaps 50 units, Perkin-Elmer eventually sold about 2,000, (Note: Some sources claim 3,000.) making them the by far largest vendor in the semiconductor fabrication equipment space through the second half of the 1970s and early 1980s. Formed into the Microlithography Division, by 1980 its income was the largest of Perkin-Elmer's divisions and provided the majority of the company's profits.

The company was slow to respond to the challenge of the stepper, which replaced the projection aligners in most roles starting in the mid-1980s. Their move to extreme ultraviolet as a response failed, as the technology was not mature. Another attempt, buying a European stepper company, did nothing to reverse their fortunes. In 1990, Perkin-Elmer sold the division to Silicon Valley Group, which is today part of ASML Holding.

== Background ==
Integrated circuits (ICs) are produced in a multi-step process known as photolithography. The process begins with thin disks of highly pure silicon being sawn from a crystalline cylinder known as a boule. After initial processing, these disks are known as wafers. The IC consists of one or more layers of lines and areas patterned onto the surface of the wafer.

The wafers are coated in a chemical known as photoresist. One layer of the ultimate chip design is printed on a "mask", similar to a stencil. The mask is placed over the wafer and an ultraviolet (UV) lamp, typically a mercury arc lamp, is shone on the mask. Depending on the process, areas of the photoresist that are exposed to the light either harden or soften, and then the softer areas are washed away using a solvent. The result is a duplication of the pattern from the mask onto the surface of the wafer. Chemical processing is then used on the pattern to give it the desired electrical qualities.

This entire process is repeated several times to build up the complete IC design. Each step uses a different design on a different mask. The features are measured in micrometres, so any previous design already deposited has to be precisely aligned with the new mask that will be applied. This is the purpose of the aligner, a task that was originally completed manually using a microscope.

There is a strong economic argument to use larger wafers, as more individual IC's can be patterned on the surface and produced in a single series of operations, thereby producing more chips during the same period of time. However, larger wafers give rise to significant optical issues; focussing the light over the area while maintaining very high uniformity was a major challenge. By the early 1970s, wafers had been about 2.5 inches in diameter for some time and were just moving to 3 inches, but existing optical systems were having problems with this size. Every time a new wafer size was introduced, the optical systems had to be redesigned from scratch.

=== Contact aligners ===
In the 1960s, the most common way to hold the mask during the exposure processes was to use a contact aligner. As the name implies, the purpose of this device was to precisely align the mask between each patterning step, and once aligned, hold the mask directly on the surface of the wafer. The reason for holding the mask on the wafer was that at the scale of the lines being drawn, diffraction of the light around the edges of the lines on the mask would blur the image if there was any distance between the mask and the wafer.

There were significant problems with the contact-mask concept. One of the most annoying was that any dust that reached the aligner's interior might stick to the mask and would be imaged on subsequent wafers as if it were part of the pattern. Equally annoying was that uncured photoresist would stick to the mask, and when the mask was lifted, it would pull off the top surface from the wafer, destroying that wafer and once again adding spurious images on the mask. Any one error might not be an issue because only the ICs in that location will be affected, but eventually, enough errors will be picked up that the mask is no longer useful.

Places like TI were buying masks, literally by the truckload, using them six to ten times, then putting them in the landfill.

— John Bossung

As a result of issues like these, masks generally lasted only a dozen times before having to be replaced. To supply the required number of masks, copies of the original mask were repeatedly printed using conventional silver halide photography on photographic stock, which was then used in the machine. The thermal stability of these masks during exposure to bright light caused distortions, which were not a concern in the early days but became an issue as feature sizes continued to shrink. This forced a move from film to glass masks, further increasing costs.

Because any particular wafer could be damaged at any given masking step, the chance that any one wafer would make it through to production without damage was a function of the number of steps. This limited the complexity of the IC designs in spite of the designers being able to make use of many more layers. Microprocessors, in particular, were complex multi-layer designs that had extremely low yield, with perhaps 1 in 10 of the patterns on a wafer delivering a working chip.

== Microprojector ==
The Micralign traces its history to a 1967 contract with the US Air Force for a higher-resolution aligner. At the time, the Air Force was one of the largest users of ICs, which were used in many of their missile systems, notably the Minuteman missile. The cost, and especially time to market, was a significant problem that the Air Force was interested in improving.

There was a second type of aligner in use, the proximity aligner. As the name implies, these held the mask in close proximity to the wafer rather than in direct contact. This improved the life of the mask and allowed a more complex design, but had the downside that diffraction effects limited its use to relatively large features compared to the contact aligners. More annoying was that the mask had to be aligned in three axes to make it perfectly flat relative to the wafer, which was a very slow process, and had to hold the mask in such a way that it didn't sag.

The Air Force had worked with Perkin-Elmer for many years on reconnaissance optics, and the Air Force Materiel Command at Wright-Patterson Air Force Base offered them a contract to see whether they could improve the proximity masking system. The result was the Microprojector. The key to the design was a 16-element lens system that produced an extremely focused light source. The resulting system could produce 2.5 μm features, 100 millionths of an inch, equal to the best contact aligners.

Although the system was effective, meeting the goals set by the Air Force, it was not practical. With a large number of lenses, dispersion was a significant problem, which they addressed by filtering out everything but a single band of UV only 200-angstrom wide (the G-line), throwing away the majority of the light coming from the 1,000 W lamp. This made the exposure times even longer than existing proximity designs.

Another significant problem was that the filters removed the visible light as well as UV, which made it impossible for the operators to view the chips during the alignment process. To solve this problem, they added an image intensifier system that produced a visible image from the UV that could be used during alignment, but this added to the unit's cost.

== New concept ==
Harold Hemstreet, manager of what was then the Electro-Optical Division, felt that Perkin-Elmer could improve on the Microprojector. He called on Abe Offner, the company's main optical designer, to come up with a solution. Offner decided to explore systems that would focus the light using mirrors instead of lenses, thus avoiding the problem of dispersion. Mirrors suffer from another problem, aberration, which makes it difficult to focus near the edges of the mirror. Combined with the desire to move to the larger 3-inch wafers, a mirror would be a difficult solution in spite of its advantages.

Offner's solution was to use only a small portion of the mirror system to image the mask, a section where the focus was guaranteed to be correct. This was along a thin ring running about halfway out from the center of the primary mirror. That meant only this sliver of the mask's image was properly focussed. This could be used if the resulting light was magnified to the size of the mask, but Rod Scott suggested that it instead be used by scanning the sliver of light across the mask.

Scanning requires the light to shine on the photoresist for the same time as it would for the entire wafer in a contact aligner, so this implied that a scanner would be much slower to operate, as it imaged only a small portion at a time. However, because the mirror was achromatic, the entire output of the lamp could be used, rather than just a small window of frequencies. In the end, the two effects offset each other, and the new system's imaging time was as good as contact systems.

John Bossung built a proof-of-concept system that copied a mask onto a photographic slide. This won another $100,000 contract from the Air Force to produce a working example.

== Practical design ==
The $100,000 would not be enough to bring such a system to commercial production, so Hemstreet had to persuade management to fund development. At the time, another division was asking for funds to develop a laser letterpress, a high-speed currency printing system, and Hemstreet had to argue they should be funded instead of that project. When the board of directors asked about the potential market, he suggested that the company might sell 50 of the systems, which was laughed at as no one could imagine a requirement for 50 such machines. Nevertheless, Hemstreet managed to win approval for the project.

In May 1971 a production team was formed, led by Jere Buckley, a mechanical designer, and Dave Markle, an optical engineer. Offner's original design required the mask and wafer to be scanned horizontally in precisely the same motion as the mask passed over the active area of the mirror system. This appeared to be fantastically difficult to arrange with the required precision. They developed a new layout where both the mask and wafer were held on opposite ends of a C-shaped holder, at right angles to the main mirror. New mirrors reflected the light through right angles so vertical motion of the holder was translated into horizontal scanning over the main mirror, and a roof prism flipped the final image so that the mask and wafer did not produce mirror images. By making the C-shaped holder large enough, rotating the assembly produced a facsimile of horizontal scanning that was more than accurate enough for the desired resolution. A flexure bearing was used to provide super-smooth rotational motion. Perkin-Elmer boasted that one could throw a handful of sand into the mechanism and it would still work perfectly. There is no record of the scanner ever failing.

The basic mechanical design was completed by November 1971. The next step was to come up with a lamp that could efficiently light the curved section of the mirror. They called Ray Paquette at Advanced Radiation Corporation, and after working on it for about two hours he had produced a sample of a curved lamp. Offner then designed a new collimator that worked with the curved shape. Because almost all of the light from the lamp was being used, scanning took 10 to 12 seconds, a dramatic improvement over older systems. The next problem was how to align the mask, as the system focussed only UV light. This was solved by adding a dielectric coating that reflected the UV but not visible light. A separate lamp was used during the alignment process, with the light passing through the optics to the microscope that the operator used to align the mask.

The product was set to launch in the summer of 1973. In a pre-launch sales effort, the company ran a series of wafers for Texas Instruments, which they then used as their "golden wafers" to show to potential clients. They showed the wafers to Raytheon who rejected them, National Semiconductor who were impressed, and Fairchild Semiconductor who produced electron microscope images of the wafers which showed they had "horrible edges". By the time they returned to company headquarters in Norcross, Raytheon had indicated that the problem might not be with the aligner itself, but the photoresist layers. They sent one of their experienced operators to Perkin-Elmer and began sorting out the practical problems of fabrication that the company had not had to deal with previously.

== Micralign 100 ==
The first sale of what was now known as the Micralign 100 was in 1974 to Texas Instruments, which paid $98,000 for the machine, equivalent to $624,833 in 2024, about three times that of existing high-end contact aligners. Sales to Intel and Raytheon followed. Intel kept their system secret, and were able to introduce new products, notably memory devices, at prices no one else could touch. The secret finally leaked out when various Intel workers left the company.

The sales pitch to early customers was simple; they could use their existing glass master masks, or "reticles", without the need to print working masks at all. The masks would last 100,000 uses instead of 10. By the next year, the company was in full-out production and had a year-long backlog of orders. By 1976, they were selling 30 a month. The only issue found during initial use was that the longer exposures led to new issues with thermal expansion, which was cured by moving from conventional soda-lime glass to borosilicate glass for the masks. (Note: Chip making has since moved to pure quartz glass due to better transmission of UV.)

The real advantage was not a reduction in mask costs, but improved yield. A 1975 report by a 3rd party research firm outlined the impressive advantages; because the contact problems with dirt and sticking emulsion were eliminated, yields had improved dramatically. For simple single-layer ICs like the 7400-series, yields improved from 75 percent with contact printing to 90 percent with the Micralign. Results were more dramatic for larger chips; a typical four-function calculator chip yielded 30 percent using contact printing, Micralign yielded 65 percent.

Microprocessors were only truly useful after the introduction of the Micralign. The Intel 8088 had yields of about 20% on older systems, improving to 60% on the Micralign. Other microprocessors were designed from the start specifically for fabrication on the Micralign. The Motorola 6800 was produced using contact aligners and sold for $295 in single units. Chuck Peddle found customers would not buy it at that cost and designed a low-cost replacement. When Motorola management refused to fund development, he left and moved to MOS Technology. Their MOS 6502 was designed specifically for the Micralign in mind, with a combination of high yield and smaller feature set allowing them to hit their design cost of $5 per unit. They introduced the 6502 only a year after the 6800, selling it for $25 in singles, and sold the subsequent 6507 with their RIOT support IC to Atari for a total of $12 per pair.

== Later generations ==
Several improvements were introduced into the line to adapt to changes in the IC market. One of the first, on the Model 110, was the addition of an automated wafer loader, which allowed the operators to rapidly mask many wafers in a row.

The Model 111 was a single-wafer model that replaced the 100, and could be adapted for use with 2-, 2.5- or 3-inch wafers, and optionally 4×4-, 3.5×3.5- or 3×3-inch masks. The Model 120 was a 111 with automatic wafer loading. The 130 worked with 100 mm wafers and 5×5-inch masks on a single wafer system, and the 140 added wafer loading to the 130. Any existing model could be adapted to other wafer and mask sizes, or add wafer loading, through conversion kits.

The second-generation Micralign was introduced in 1979. This offered higher resolutions and the ability to work with larger wafers, but also cost much more at $250,000, equivalent to $1,083,104 in 2024. This higher price was offset by its ability to print more chips per wafer, due to the smaller feature sizes. 1981's Model 500 increased throughput to 100 wafers an hour, offsetting its $675,000 price, equivalent to $2,334,581 in 2024 via improved throughput.

By the early 1980s, Perkin-Elmer was firmly in control of the majority of the aligner market, in spite of concerted efforts on the parts of many companies to enter the space. Between 1976 and 1980, overall company sales tripled to $966 million, equivalent to $3,686,483,845 in 2024, of which $104 million was from the Microlithography Division, making it the single largest division of the company, and by far the most profitable.

== Exiting the market ==
While Perkin-Elmer was introducing the Micralign, several other companies were working on different solutions to the same basic problem of focussing a light across the ever-growing wafers. GCA, formerly Geophysical Corporation of America, had been working on a concept that focused on only a small part of the wafer at a time, magnifying the image of the mask about 10-to-1 so it could shine more light through a much larger mask and make up for the fact that it used only a single band of UV light. IBM had purchased one at about the same time the Micralign came to market, but gave up on the system and concluded it could never work.

By 1981, GCA had solved the problems in the stepper system. During that period, the chip industry had continually moved to denser features and more complex designs. The Micralign was running out of resolution, while the additional magnification in the GCA system allowed it to operate at finer feature sizes. With roughly the same speed that the Micralign ended sales of contact printers, GCA's stepper ended sales of the Micralign. Perkin-Elmer had simply not listened to its customers who were clamoring for higher resolution, and ignored the research and development of newer systems.

Instead of steppers, the Perkin-Elmer Model 600 bet on "deep UV" (DUV) as a solution to the resolution problem. IBM used these to run a memory chip series, but no-one else had an effective photoresist that worked in DUV, and few other customers purchased the system. Steppers were far slower than the Micralign and much more expensive, so sales started very slowly, but by the mid-1980s the stepper was rapidly taking over the market.

In an effort to stay in the market, in 1984 Perkin-Elmer purchased Censor, a stepper company from Liechtenstein. The product never made major inroads in the market, and in spite of GCA's bankruptcy in 1987, Perkin-Elmer decided to give up on the Microlithography Division and put it on the market in April 1989, along with their electron-beam lithography (EBL) division. The EBL work quickly sold, but the aligner division lingered. In 1990 it was purchased by the Silicon Valley Group (SVGL) in a multi-way deal involving IBM whose involvement was brokered by Nikon. SVGL was purchased by ASML Holding in 2001.
