= Photronics =

American photomask manufacturer

Photronics, Inc.
- Type: Public
- Traded as: Nasdaq: PLAB; S&P 600 component
- Industry: Semiconductor (integrated circuits, flat-panel displays)
- Founded: 1969; 57 years ago
- Headquarters: Brookfield, Connecticut
- Key people: Constantine S. Macricostas (chairman); Frank Lee (CEO)
- Products: Photomasks
- Revenue: ▲US$892.1 million (2023)
- Operating income: ▲US$253.05 million (2023)
- Net income: ▲US$200 million (2023)
- Total assets: ▲US$1.53 billion (2023)
- Total equity: ▲US$1.28 billion (2023)
- Number of employees: 1,885 (October 31, 2023)
- Website: photronics.com

Photronics, Inc. is an American photomask manufacturer for integrated circuits and flat-panel displays. It was the third largest photomask supplier globally as of 2009. It is a member of the eBeam Initiative.

== History ==
Photronics was founded in 1969 by Constantine Macricostas in Danbury, Connecticut.
