= Suss Microtec =

German mechanical engineering company

SUSS MicroTec SE
- Company type: Public
- Traded as: SDAX, TecDAX
- Industry: Semiconductor
- Founded: 1949
- Founder: Karl Süss
- Headquarters: Garching near Munich, Germany
- Area served: Worldwide
- Key people: Burkhardt Frick (CEO), Dr. Cornelia Ballwießer (CFO), Dr. Thomas Rohe (COO), David Dean (Chairman of the Supervisory Board)
- Products: Mask Aligners, Coaters, Wafer Bonders, Inkjet Printers, Projection Scanners, Metrology Systems, Photomask Equipment
- Revenue: €446.1 million (FY 2024)
- Number of employees: 1,498 (FY 2024)
- Website: www.suss.com

Suss Microtec SE (own spelling SUSS MicroTec SE, known as Süss MicroTec until 2024 and as Karl Süss GmbH & Co. KG until 1999) is a mechanical engineering company with headquarters in Garching near Munich, Germany. It offers systems and processes for the semiconductor market, the nano and microsystems technology, and related markets.

The systems and processes for microstructuring are used in the manufacturing of memory chips, processors, MEMS, LEDs, and other microsystem components. The company offers products for the processing of lithographic photomasks and the advanced backend of the semiconductor value chain. It serves as a supplier for both industrial high-volume production and institutions in the field of research and development.

== Corporate Development ==
=== 1949 to 1980: Founding years and entry into semiconductor industry ===
On April 1, 1949, then 47-year-old Karl Süss founded Karl Süss KG and, as a sales representative for Bavaria, took over the distribution of optical devices (microscopes, cameras, and laboratory equipment) from Ernst Leitz GmbH. With increasing technical expertise, the company evolved from a pure sales company with five employees to a contract manufacturer.

In 1963, Süss received a commission from Siemens to develop a simple photolithography device. This commission involved small measuring tables with stereo microscopes bonded together. For Siemens, Süss developed the prototype of the first mask aligner MJB3, a mask alignment exposure tool for photolithography. This commission marked the company’s first step into the semiconductor industry, which later became its core market. In 1968, the company moved its production and 30 employees to Garching.

With the development of the semiconductor industry, Süss began manufacturing diamond scribers and spin coaters. In 1974, the first mask aligner enabling micrometer-precise double-sided exposure was developed at Süss. The company, whose name already stood for photolithography in the research and development sector, now also focused on customers from the manufacturing industry. In 1975, the MJB55 became the first mask aligner developed for mass production.

=== 1980 to 2010: Internationalisation and IPO ===
During the 1980s, Süss expanded internationally. The first foreign facility was established in 1980 in the United States in Waterbury, Vermont. In Vermont, the company subsequently went into volume production with the wafer bonder. In 1983, an Asian subsidiary was established in Thailand, followed by sales offices in Japan, China, and Taiwan. In addition, the company made a foray into the very specialized field of X-ray stepper lithography.

In 1989, Süss developed its first substrate bonder in response to growing demand for microsystems. In microsystems technology, substrate bonders allowed heterogeneous materials to be bonded with structured surfaces. As early as 1982, business cooperations existed between Süss and VEB Elektromat Dresden in the GDR. After the GDR ended, the subsidiary Karl-Süss-Dresden GmbH was founded in September 1990 together with former VEB director Reinhard Welsch, based in Sacka near Dresden, where production for Süss subsequently took place.

In 1993, Süss expanded its product range with the acquisition of the French company S.E.T. which produced spin coaters and device bonders. In this context, Süss added device bonders to its product range. In 1994, company founder Karl Süss and his eldest son Ekkehard Süss passed away in close succession. The subsequent payout to Ekkehard Süss's children led the Süss family to relinquish their majority stake in the company. However, Winfried Süss, the second-born son of Karl Süss, continued to represent the family on the supervisory board until 2008. In 1999, the holding company of the Süss Group went public as Süss Microtec AG.

Later in 1999, Convac (sold by Fairchild Semiconductor) and Fairchild Technologies were added as subsidiaries. This allowed the company to integrate coating systems into its offering. Through the acquisition of Fairchild Technologies, the company entered the upper market segments with coating systems in 2000. In 2001, the acquisition of Image Technology followed. Starting in 2002, Süss Microtec entered the micro-optics business with the newly founded subsidiary Suss MicroOptics, based in Neuchâtel, Switzerland.

In 2007, the device bonder product division was discontinued and sold to the French company S.E.T. S.A.S. as part of a management buy-out. At the end of the 2000s, new offices were opened in Singapore and South Korea.

=== Since 2010: More recent developments ===
The 2010s were marked by fluctuations in the market for semiconductor equipment. In response, the company changed its business strategy and initiated a focus on its core competencies as well as acquisitions. In 2010, Süss Microtec acquired HamaTech APE, a manufacturer of equipment for photomask processing technology. In 2012, Süss Microtec acquired Tamarack Scientific, based in Corona, California, a company that developed, produced, and marketed laser processing technology for transferring microstructures.

At the same time, several divestments took place. In 2010, the subsidiary in the Saxon town of Sacka, where systems for testing micro-components had most recently been produced, was sold to the American company Cascade Microtech. That same year, production of substrate bonders was relocated from Waterbury to the Sternenfels site acquired from Hamatech APE. From then on, coating systems, bonders, and photomask processing systems were produced in the same facility. In 2011, the American subsidiary MicroTec Precision Photomask Inc. based in Palo Alto, which worked on photomasks, was sold to a subsidiary of the US corporation OM Group.

Süss Microtec expanded its production capacities in 2020 with a new production facility in Taiwan. Additionally, in the same year, another technology was added when the company acquired PiXDRO, the inkjet printing business unit of solar equipment manufacturer Meyer Burger.

As a result of the AI boom since 2023, Süss Microtec experienced a significant increase in revenue and market value, as the company is part of the extended supply chain of market leader Nvidia. Consequently, the company had to increase its production capacity.

Suss MicroOptics, the subsidiary for optical microlenses established in 2002, was sold to Focuslight Technologies Inc. in 2024. The purpose of the sale, according to Süss Microtec, was to focus on the core business of semiconductor equipment. In addition, the company was renamed from SÜSS MicroTec SE to SUSS MicroTec SE in 2024 to eliminate the umlaut in light of its international presence. SUSS was introduced as the new brand.

== Company structure ==
Suss MicroTec SE is headquartered in Garching near Munich. The company is managed by a three-member management board and a five-member supervisory board. In addition to its headquarters in Garching, the company operates further production sites in Sternenfels, Germany, and in Hsinchu, Taiwan. Sales subsidiaries of Suss Microtec exist in Thailand, Japan, Taiwan, China, and Korea, among others.

Suss Microtec is largely held in free float. As of June 2025, shareholders with stakes exceeding 3% include: Van Lanschot Kempen (9.893%), Teslin Capital Management (7.5%), Janus Henderson (5.043%), and JPMorgan Asset Management (3.012%). The company is listed on both the SDAX and the TecDAX.

=== Subsidiary Companies ===
The German subsidiaries of the parent company Suss MicroTec SE (as of the end of 2024) are:

- Suss MicroTec Solutions GmbH & Co. KG, Sternenfels
- Suss MicroTec Photomask Equipment Beteiligungs-GmbH, Sternenfels

The international subsidiaries of Suss Microtec (as of the end of 2024) are:

- Suss MicroTec Ltd., Market Rasen, United Kingdom
- Suss MicroTec KK, Yokohama, Japan
- Suss MicroTec S.A.S., Pierre-Bénite, France
- Suss MicroTec Inc., Corona, United States
- Suss MicroTec (Taiwan) Company Ltd., Hsinchu, Taiwan
- Suss MicroTec Company Ltd., Shanghai, China
- Suss MicroTec (Singapore) Pte. Ltd, Singapore
- Suss MicroTec Korea Co. Ltd., Hwaseong, South Korea
- Suss MicroTec Netherlands B.V., Eindhoven, Netherlands

== Research and Development ==
The company's founder already maintained a close exchange with science. Suss Microtec is expanding its efforts in the area of research and development in order to increase innovation. In addition to lively development activities and intensive cooperation with research institutes and universities, all processes are geared to a high development speed and efficiency in order to improve the added value for users. Suss Microtec cooperates with various research organizations worldwide.

== Products ==
Suss Microtec supplies a range of equipment for semiconductor manufacturing. This includes coaters and developers, inkjet printers, mask aligners, UV projection scanners, imprint lithography equipment, metrology systems, wafer bonders, and photomask systems.

The company offers, among other things, equipment and processes for temporary wafer bonding, which is used in the production of microchips needed for AI applications. Suss Microtec is also part of the supply chain of Nvidia (as of 2024). In 2024, Joachim Hofer wrote in the Handelsblatt that Nvidia relies on high-performance semiconductors with High Bandwidth Memory (HBM) as an "indispensable complement" to its graphics processors (GPUs). Some of the systems used to produce these HBM chips originate from Suss Microtec.

Key end-use applications for the sensors and micro-electromechanical systems (MEMS) whose manufacturers are supplied by Suss Microtec are consumer electronics (consumer electronics, household appliances, cell phones, cameras, etc.), mechanical engineering, control, measurement and regulation technology, processors, laboratory technology, medical technology, automotive, aerospace and security applications.
