= FOUP =

Box used to store and transfer large semiconductor wafers

FOUP (an acronym for front-opening unified pod or front-opening universal pod) is a specialized plastic carrier designed to hold silicon wafers securely and safely in a controlled environment, and to allow the wafers to be transferred between machines for processing or measurement.

FOUPs began to appear along with the first 300mm wafer processing tools in the mid 1990s. The size of the wafers and their comparative lack of rigidity meant that SMIF pods were not a viable form factor. FOUP standards were developed by SEMI and SEMI members to ensure that FOUPs and all equipment that interacts with FOUPs work together seamlessly. Transitioning from a SMIF pod to a FOUP design, the removable cassette used to hold wafers was replaced by fixed wafer columns. The door was relocated from a bottom orientation to a front orientation, where automated handling equipment can access the wafers. Pitch for a 300 mm FOUP is 10 mm, while 13 slot FOUPs can have a pitch up to 20 mm. The weight of a fully loaded 25 wafer FOUP is between 7 and 9 kilograms which means that automated material handling systems are essential for all but the smallest of fabrication plants. To allow this, each FOUP has coupling plates and interface holes to allow the FOUP to be positioned on a load port, and to be picked up and transferred by the AMHS (automated material handling system) to other process tools or to storage locations such as a stocker or undertrack storage. FOUPs may use RF tags that allow them to be identified by RF readers on tools or AMHS. FOUPs are available in several colors, depending on the customer's wish.

FOUPs have begun to have the capability to have a purge gas applied by process, measurement and storage tools in an effort to increase device yield. FOUPs can be purged inside a FOUP stocker or at the equipment accessing the FOUP.

== FOSB ==
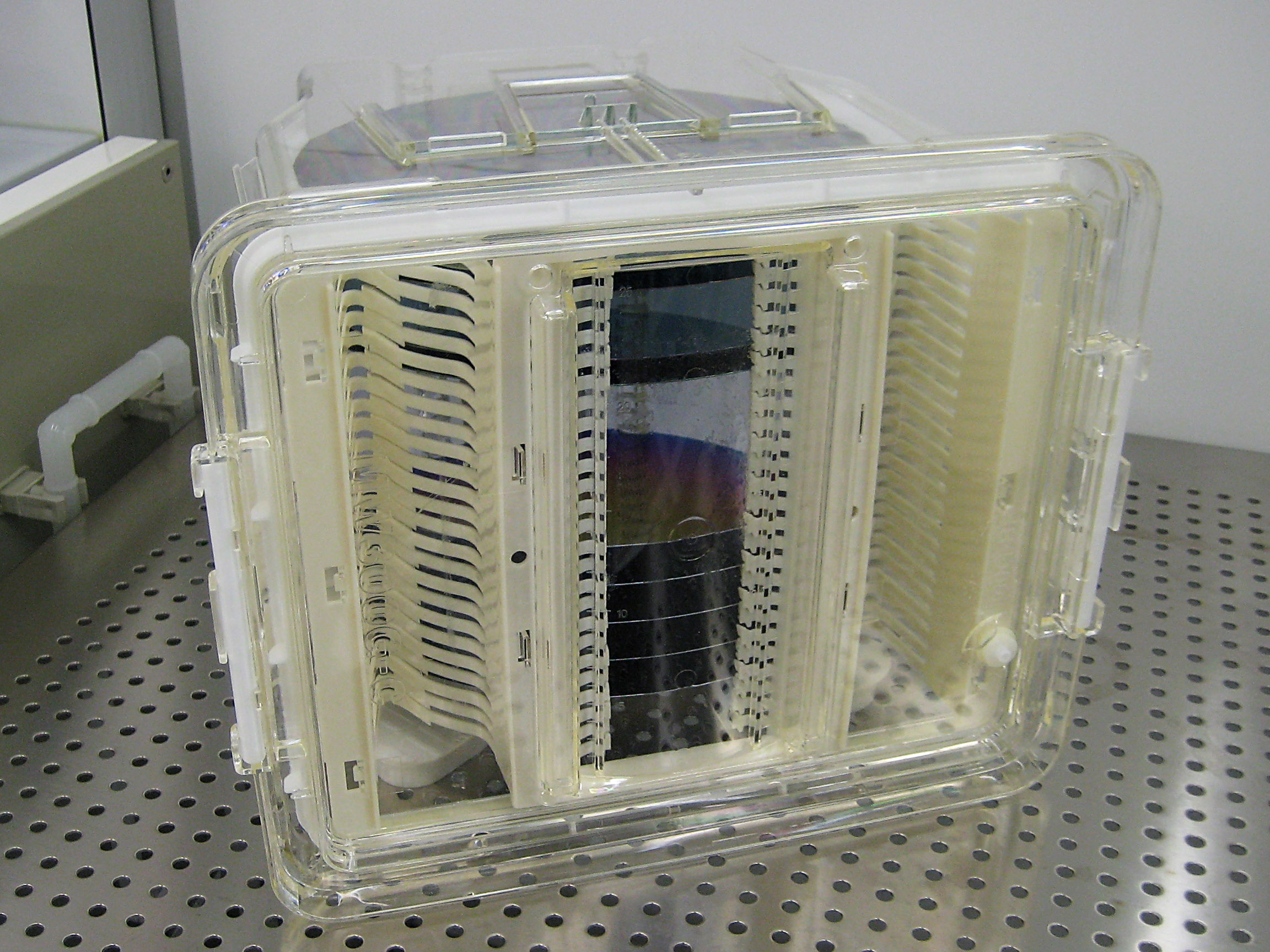
The front side of a front opening shipping box (FOSB) with manual (non-FIMS) door.

FOSB is an acronym for front-opening shipping box. FOSBs are used for transporting wafers between manufacturing facilities.

== Manufacturers ==
- ePAK
- 3S Korea
- CKplas
- Dainichi Shoji
- Entegris
- E-SUN System Technology
- Gudeng Precision
- Mirail
- Shin-Etsu Polymer

== See also ==
- SMIF
- Wafer fabrication equipment
