= Mask inspection =

In microtechnology, mask inspection or photomask inspection is an operation of checking the correctness of the fabricated photomasks, used, e.g., for semiconductor device fabrication.

Modern technologies for locating defects in photomasks are automated systems that involve scanning electron microscopy and other advanced tools.

== Mask data inspection ==
The term "mask inspection" may also informally refer to mask data inspection step performed before actual writing the real mask. Other methods of inspection use specially constructed light microscope systems such as are available from Probing Solutions Inc. These rely on white light, typically optimized at approximately 538 nM and use incident bright and dark field as well as transmitted bright and dark field illumination to see pin holes, edge defects and many forms of contamination and substrate defects.
