= Aligner (semiconductor) =

Aligns a photomask with features on a wafer

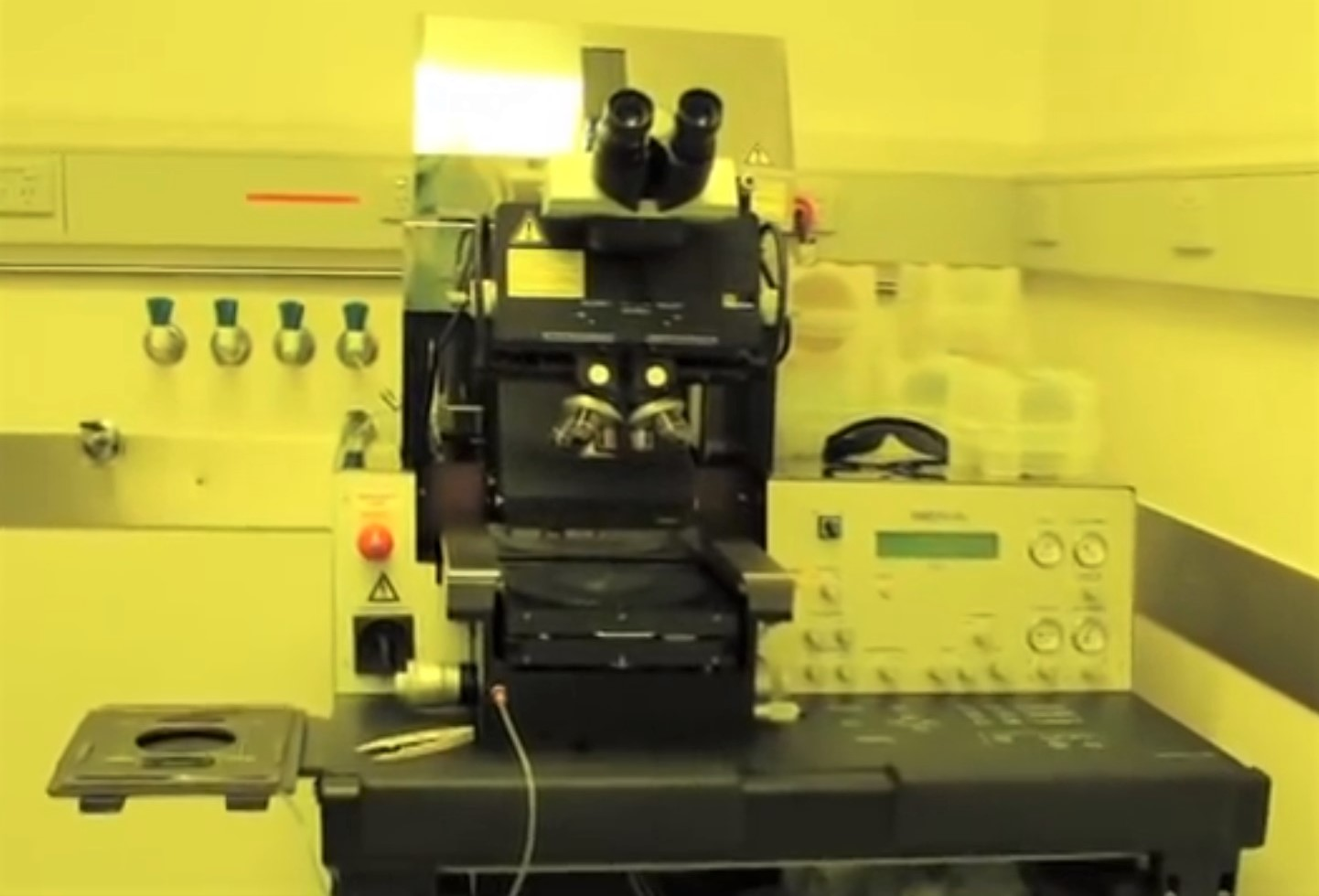
A SÜSS MicroTec MA6 mask aligner

An aligner, or mask aligner, is a system that produces integrated circuits (IC) using the photolithography process. It holds the photomask over the silicon wafer while a bright light is shone through the mask and onto the photoresist. The "alignment" refers to the ability to place the mask over precisely the same location repeatedly as the chip goes through multiple rounds of lithography.

Aligners were a major part of IC manufacture from the 1960s into the late 1970s, when they began to be replaced by the stepper. Currently, mask aligners are still used in academia and research, as projects often involve devices made using photolithography in smaller batches. In a mask aligner, there is a one-to-one correspondence between the mask pattern and the wafer pattern. The mask covers the entire surface of the wafer which is exposed in its entirety in one shot. This was the standard for the 1:1 mask aligners that were succeeded by steppers and scanners with reduction optics.

There are several distinct generations of aligner technology. The early contact aligners placed the mask in direct contact with the top surface of the wafer, which often damaged the pattern when the mask was lifted off again. Used only briefly, proximity aligners held the mask slightly above the surface to avoid this problem, but were difficult to work with and required considerable manual adjustment. Finally, the Micralign projection aligner, introduced by Perkin-Elmer in 1973, held the mask entirely separate from the chip and made the adjustment of the image much simpler. Through these stages of development, yields improved from perhaps 10% to about 70%, leading to a corresponding reduction in chip prices.

== Components ==
A typical mask aligner consists of the following parts:

- Microscope, used to see the position of the wafer substrate and mask, and their relative alignment
- Wafer holder (or chuck), used to immobilize the wafer, often using a vacuum line below.
- Mask holder, placing the mask immediately above the wafer. Relative position between the wafer and the mask can be adjusted using a typical microscope stage mechanism.
- UV light source, which illuminates through the photomask to project its shadow onto the wafer below.

== Comparison with stepper ==
The projection aligner is similar to the wafer stepper in concept, but with one key difference. The aligner uses a mask that holds the pattern for the entire wafer, which may require large masks. The stepper uses a smaller mask on the wafer repeatedly, and steps across the surface to repeat the pattern of the chip layer. This reduces mask costs dramatically and allows a single wafer to be used for different integrated circuit layouts or mask designs in a single run. More importantly, by focusing the light source onto a single area of the wafer, the stepper can produce much higher resolutions, thus allowing for smaller features on chips (minimum feature size). The disadvantage to the stepper is that each chip on the wafer has to be individually imaged, and thus the process of exposing the wafer as a whole is much slower.
