= Dai Nippon Printing =

Japanese printing company

Dai Nippon Printing Co., Ltd

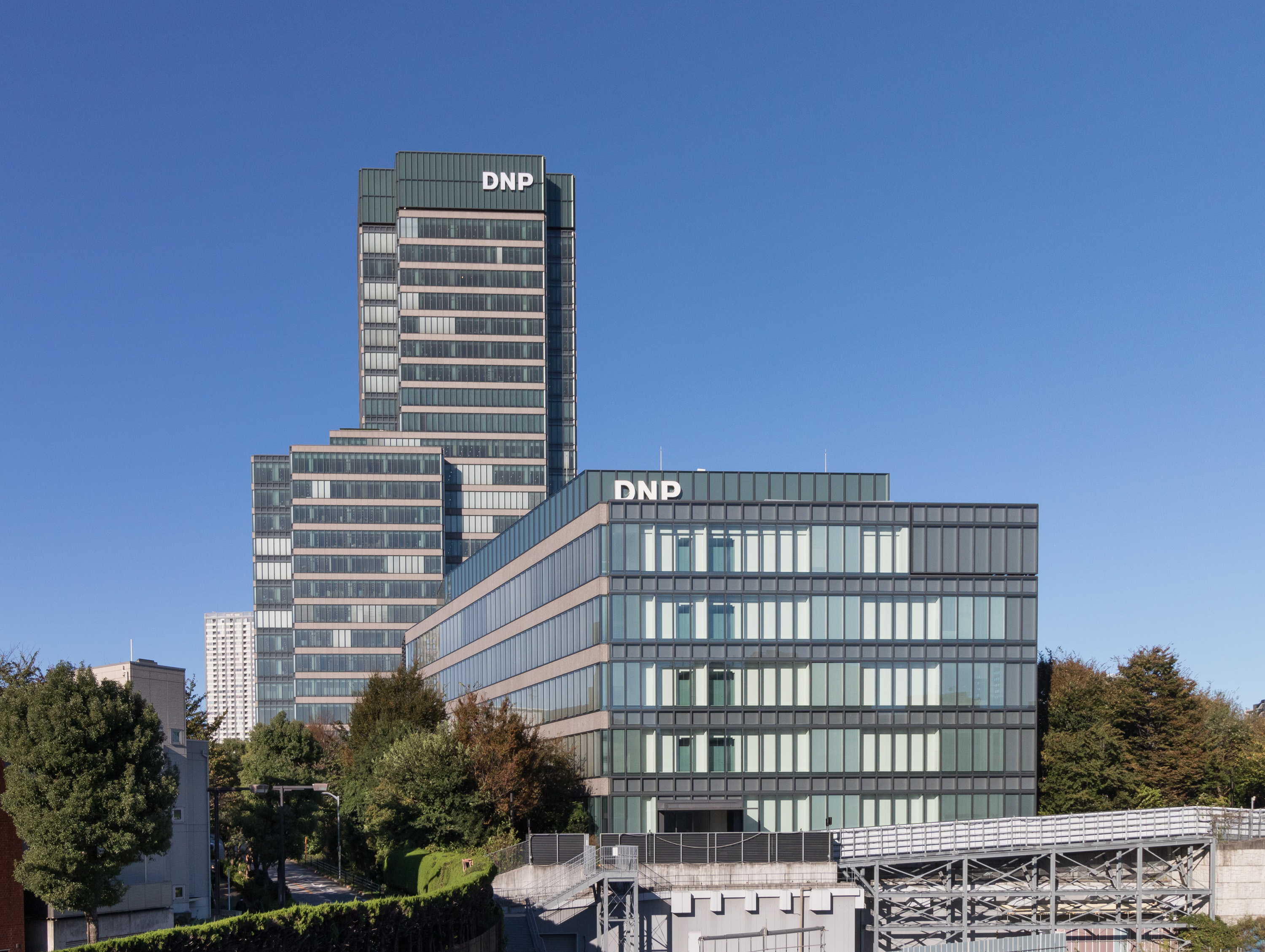
- DNP's headquarters in Shinjuku, Tokyo, Japan
- Native name: 大日本印刷株式会社
- Romanized name: Dai Nippon Insatsu kabushiki gaisha
- Type: Public kabushiki gaisha
- Traded as: TYO: 7912
- Industry: Printing
- Founded: October 9, 1876; 150 years ago
- Headquarters: Ichigayakagacho, Shinjuku, Tokyo, Japan
- Key people: Yoshitoshi Kitajima (president)
- Products: IC tag, thermal transfer ribbons, smart card, shadow mask, photomask, building material
- Services: Business service, commercial printing
- Revenue: ¥1,466,400,000,000 (as of March 31, 2023)
- Number of employees: 38,246 (consolidated, 2023)
- Subsidiaries: DNP Imagingcomm Europe; DNP Imagingcomm America
- Website: www.dnp.co.jp/eng/

Dai Nippon Printing (大日本印刷, Dai Nippon Insatsu), established in 1876, is a Japanese printing company which operates its printing in three areas: information communications, lifestyle and industrial supplies, and electronics.

The company is involved in a wide variety of printing processes, ranging from magazines to shadow masks for the production of displays, as well as out-coupling enhancement structures for LCD displays and scattering for display backlights. They employ more than 35,000 people.

Dai Nippon also operates Honto.jp, an online "hybrid" bookstore that sells both print and digital books.

== DNP Imagingcomm America Corporation ==
DNP Imagingcomm America Corporation (DNP IAM) is a US-based subsidiary of Dai Nippon Printing, segmented into three categories: Photo, Barcode, and Card. Formerly known as DNP IMS America, the subsidiary renamed in June 2014 to DNP Imagingcomm America Corporation. The company's barcode division manufactures thermal transfer ribbon technology, and the company's photo division manufactures dye-sublimation media for its card customers and printers and media for retailers, event photographers, and photo booth operators in North American, Canadian, and Latin American markets. Shinichi Yamashita was appointed president of DNP IAM in October 2017.

DNP IAM manufactures thermal transfer ribbons for a variety of applications including automotive, electronics, food and beverage, inventory and logistics, pharmaceutical, and retail. It also manufactures printers and media for photo booth operators, event photographers, and retailers in North America and Latin America.

Its DS620A, DS820A, and DS-RX1HS dye-sublimation printers are widely used in the photography industry. It launched its QW410 printer in 2020, which is known as the smallest dye-sublimation printer on the market. DNP IAM also manufactures the media required to print using dye-sublimation technology.

DNP IAM designed a Snap Lab SL620A kiosk system for retailers and manufactures a passport and ID photo solution called the IDW520.

== See also ==
- Vertical, Inc., an American publisher joint-venture with Kodansha publishing English-translated Japanese literature, most prominently known for the works of Koji Suzuki
- Toppan Printing Co., main competitor
