= Toppan =

Japanese printing company

Toppan Holdings Inc.

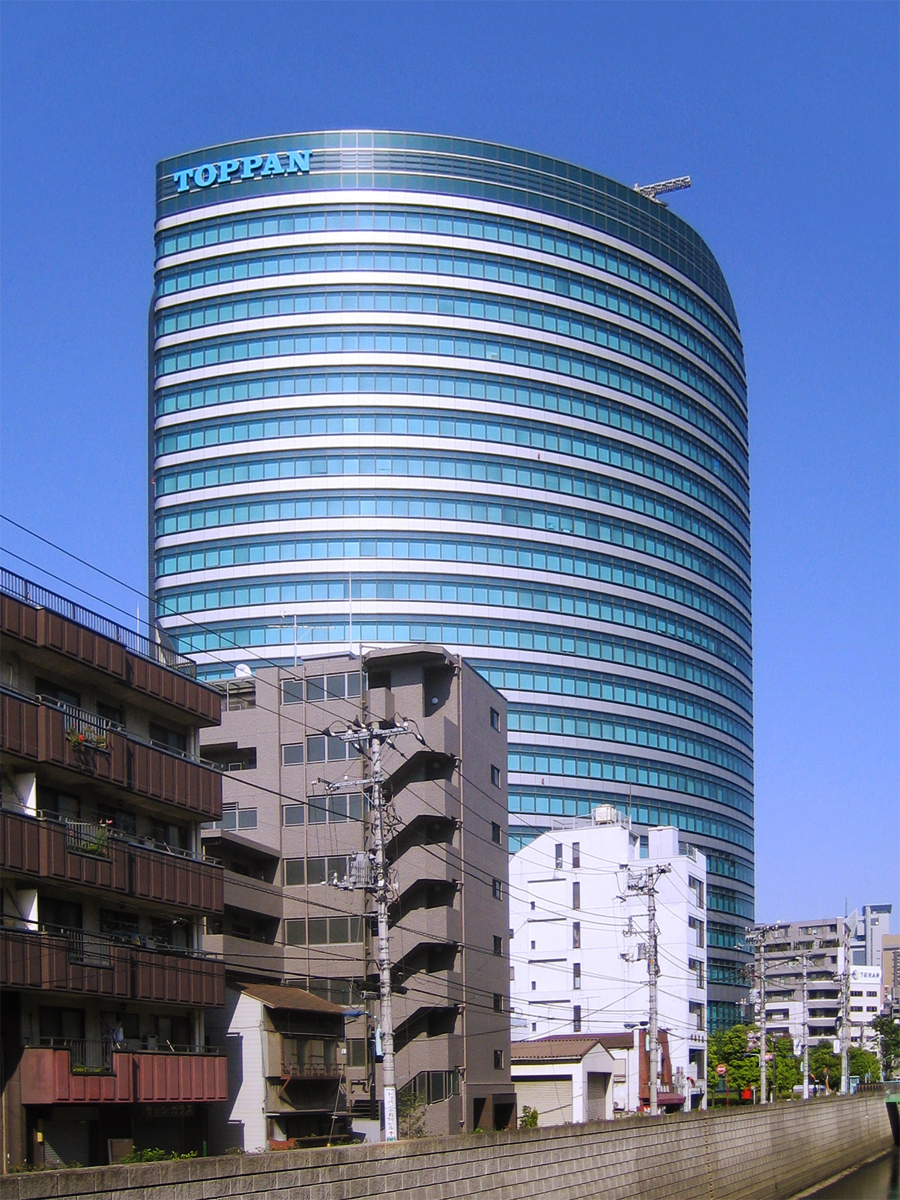
- Headquarters in Taitō, Tokyo
- Formerly: Toppan Printing Co., Ltd. (1908-2023)
- Type: Public
- Traded as: TYO: 7911; Nikkei 225 Component
- Industry: Printing
- Founded: January 17, 1900; 126 years ago
- Headquarters: Taitō, Taitō, Tokyo, Japan
- Key people: Shingo Kaneko (CEO & president)
- Products: Commercial and publication printing services; Packaging products; Functional material products; Smart cards; Interior decor materials; Photomasks; Optical filters; Touch sensor substrates
- Revenue: $ 15.793 billion (FY 2012) (¥ 1,502 billion) (FY 2012)
- Net income: $ 197.36 million (FY 2012) (¥ 18.562 billion) (FY 2012)
- Number of employees: 48,878 (consolidated) (as of March 2013)
- Website: www.holdings.toppan.com/en/ (in English)

Toppan Holdings Inc. (TOPPANホールディングス株式会社, Toppan Hōrudingusu Kabushiki-gaisha) is a Japanese global printing company. Toppan was founded in 1900 and is headquartered in Tokyo.

== History ==
As of March 2013, the company has 169 subsidiary and affiliate companies. Toppan is listed on the Tokyo Stock Exchange and is a constituent of the Nikkei 225 stock index.

In December 2020, Toppan acquired Taiwanese software company iDGate in order to integrate iDGate's electronic know your customer (eKYC) technology into its identity card business.

== Critics ==
Toppan Printing Co., Ltd. faced criticism for continuing operations in Russia despite international calls to exit the market following Russia's invasion of Ukraine. The company has not issued a public statement addressing its activities in Russia, raising ethical concerns among stakeholders. While Toppan implemented policies like an anti-corruption framework and conflict mineral procurement guidelines, its presence in Russia continues to draw scrutiny. Advocacy groups highlight the lack of transparency and accountability regarding its decisions amid the ongoing geopolitical crisis.

== Business segments and products ==
=== Information and networks ===
- Securities and cards: investment security certificates, passbooks, product coupons, gift certificates, lottery tickets, data printing, IC cards
- Commercial printing: posters, catalogs, pamphlets, flyers, direct mailings, calendars, yearbooks, corporate communication tools
- Publications printing: weekly and monthly magazines, books, art books, dictionaries and other reference books, textbooks, electronic publications
- Business forms: RFID and NFC solutions, digital-media related business, integrated slips

=== Living environment ===
- Packaging: flexible packaging materials, paper containers, cups, molded plastic products, complex liquid containers, cardboard containers, marketing planning, product planning, development and manufacturing of functional packaging and materials
- Functional products: solar cell backsheets, molded plastic products for electronic devices, materials for recording information, components for secondary batteries
- Interior decor materials: decorative paper/films, wallpaper, flooring materials, interior fixtures, decorative panels

=== Electronics ===
- Displays: LCD color filters, anti-reflection films, electromagnetic wave shield mesh for plasma displays
- Semiconductors: photomasks for semiconductors (Tekscend Photomasks), design services for LSI, device OEM, leadframes, BGA/CSP substrates, color filter arrays for image sensors and small display devices, etched products, printed circuit boards. Tekscend is a member of the eBeam Initiative.
