= SiCarrier =

Chinese semiconductor equipment company

Shenzhen SiCarrier Technologies Co., Ltd.
- Native name: 深圳市新凯来技术有限公司
- Type: Municipally owned corporation
- Industry: Semiconductor equipment
- Founded: August 2021; 5 years ago
- Headquarters: Shenzhen, Guangdong, China
- Key people: Du Lijun (President)
- Owner: Shenzhen Municipal Government
- Website: www.sicarrier.com

Shenzhen SiCarrier Technologies Co., Ltd. (SiCarrier; Chinese: 新凯来; pinyin: Xīnkǎilái) is a Chinese semiconductor equipment company headquartered in Shenzhen. The company is backed by the Shenzhen Municipal Government and works extensively with Huawei.

== Background ==
SiCarrier was established in 2021 in Shenzhen. Its major backer is the Shenzhen Major Industry Investment Group, a semiconductor investment fund established by the Shenzhen Municipal Government.

SiCarrier has formed a close relationship with Huawei,where it mainly interfaces with its internal research arm, 2012 Lab which is named after the 2012 film. The two have exchanged both staff and patents. SiCarrier has hired engineers to work directly on Huawei's projects. Huawei has transferred about a dozen patents to SiCarrier, including sound-proof technologies for electronic machines and data center designs. Apart from being a semiconductor equipment manufacture for Huawei, SiCarrier also is a nexus between Huawei and the rest of the supply chain. SiCarrier has subsidiaries that are involved in critical processes for semiconductors such as Cornerstone (photoresist), Zetop (photolithography) and Ueascend (chip equipment).

In late 2023, SiCarrier was granted a patent involving self-aligned quadruple patterning (SAQP). The patent employed deep ultraviolet lithography chipmaking machines and SAQP technology to achieve certain technical thresholds for the 5 nm process. This could avoid the use of extreme ultraviolet lithography machines while reducing manufacturing cost. The underlying technology was seen to used by Huawei to produce a 7nm chip for its Mate 60 Pro smartphone in 2024.

In December 2024, SiCarrier was targeted in a new round of US export controls and added to the United States Department of Commerce's Entity List.

In March 2025, SiCarrier made its debut at Semicon China, an annual industry event in Shanghai organized by SEMI. At the event, it unveiled dozens of tools which related to etching and deposition process, optical metrology and inspection which attracted significant attention. Prior to the event, SiCarrier held a low profile. SiCarrier then emerged as a challenger to ASML and other foreign companies in the semiconductor equipment field.

In September 2025, Semiconductor Manufacturing International Corporation started to conduct trials of a DUV machine made by Shanghai Yuliangsheng Technology (a project tied to SiCarrier). SMIC plans to integrate these DUV machines into production lines in 2027.

In December 2025, Reuters has reported on the progress of domestic EUV machines. According to report it is expected that a EUV machine for producing working chips will be ready by around 2028-2030. Changchun Institute of Optics, Fine Mechanics and Physics offers uncapped salaries to PhD researches in lithography and grants up to 4 miliion yuan (560,000 USD) and 1 million yuan (140,000 USD) in personal grants. There is also aggressive hiring of researchers from outside of China: signing bonuses of 3-5 million yuan (420k-700k USD) and home purchase subsidy.

== See also ==
- Naura Technology
- Advanced Micro-Fabrication Equipment
- Shanghai Micro Electronics Equipment
- Dongfang Jingyuan Electron Limited
