= Shanghai Micro Electronics Equipment =

Chinese lithography machine manufacturer

Shanghai Micro Electronics Equipment (Group) Co., Ltd.
- Native name: 上海微电子装备 (集团)股份有限公司
- Type: Private (part government-backed)
- Industry: Semiconductors
- Founded: 2002
- Founder: He Rongming
- Headquarters: Shanghai, China
- Key people: Gan Pin (Chairman)
- Owner: SASAC (32%)
- Website: www.smee.com.cn

Shanghai Micro Electronics Equipment (Group) Co., Ltd. (SMEE) is a semiconductor manufacturing equipment company based in Shanghai, China. The company is involved in the research, development, manufacture and sale of lithography scanners and inspection tools to the semiconductor manufacturing industry; it also provides support services to its customers.

== Company history ==
SMEE was established in 2002 by He Rongming, a former vice president at Shanghai Electric. It was originally a lithography machine technology research project under the 863 Program. After a few years of research, SMEE rolled out the first domestically made lithography machine for commercial use.

In December 2017, SMEE signed a contract with CSC Financial to prepare it to become a public company. During the process, SMEE acquired funding from investors such as China Everbright Limited. There was a change in the management team afterwards leading He to leave SMEE in early 2018.

== Product history ==
Prior to 2023, SMEE's most advanced product for manufacturing front-end semiconductor chips was the SSA600, which has a scanning resolution that is capable of fabricating 90 nm-class integrated circuit silicon chips. The SSA600 series machines has been described by observers as an immersion deep ultraviolet lithography tool which features an argon fluoride (ArF) excimer laser emitting coherent ultraviolet light at a wavelength of 193 nm.

=== SSA800x (December 2023) ===
In December 2023, western media reported that SMEE has completed the initial development of its new SSA800-10W immersion lithography machine which has a scanning resolution capable of fabricating 28 nm-process class chips. Instances of the new machine may have been delivered to manufacturers such as SMIC and to research institutes. SSA800 continues to use ArF laser as its light source but also includes better tools and components which enable manufacturers to fashion circuit features associated with 28 nm-process technology. Western media reported that SSA800 is designed so that none of its components include intellectual properties that originate in the United States . Some analysts suggest that it is likely the Chinese government had asked SMEE to benchmark its new 28 nm-capable DUV immersion system against the similar ASML NXT:2000i system and that SSA800 is part of a fully domestic production line which is currently undergoing test production and certification. As of early 2024, SMEE's website does not yet include the new SSA800 lithography machine in its product list section.

In the future, a version of the SSA800 may be employed on processes below the 28 nm node via multi-patterning; generally, photolithography techniques developed in the field of multiple patterning allow immersion lithography machines using an ArF laser light source to fashion integrated circuits features associated with technologies as advanced as 7 nm or even 5 nm processes. For example, in 2016, media reports implied that Intel's then new 10 nm-process employed immersion DUV machines in combination with self-aligned double patterning techniques to achieve the desired circuit feature size, rather than using the latest EUV photolithography technology.

SMEE's SSA800 machine lags photolithography industry leader ASML Holding in time: ASML first delivered 28 nm-capable machines to TSMC in 2011.

=== I-line and KrF product mix ===
Prior to the introduction of the SSA800 scanner series in 2023, SMEE had developed a range of lithography, metrology, and derivative equipment, including four series of machines for the manufacture of front-end integrated circuits (such as the SSA600 series scanners), back-end IC packaging, LEDs, MEMS, IC power devices, and TFTs.

In early November 2026, SMEE disclosed via a Chinese social-media post that its current mix of front-end dry lithography machines employ Chinese domestic suppliers for parts such as high-precision objective lenses and illumination systems, high speed dual-stage and mask stages, integrated automated material handling systems, and high-precision alignment and leveling sensing systems. SMEE claims that its domestically produced front-end dry lithography machines are comparable in imaging performance to leading international products. According to the social-media post, multiple SMEE machines have been operating stably in Chinese logic and memory chips mass production lines supporting the fabrication of more than 10 million wafers to date and achieving an operating efficiency rate of over 92 percent. At about the same time, SMEE's website began listing additional front-end lithography machines on its product page, including the SSB-800 (I-line) and the SSC-800 (KrF).

=== EUV lithography ===
In 2024, SMEE filed a patent for an EUV lithography scanner to manufacture advanced chips, which is currently only produced by Netherlands' ASML; some observers suggest that there may be up to three separate current efforts within China, involving private, state, and educational institutions other than SMEE, to develop and deliver a prototype Chinese EUV lithography scanner in the next few years. The key driver in the development of advanced Chinese lithography equipment appears to be a government-backed effort to strengthen public-private collaboration in order to enhance innovation; in particular, the state seeks to overcome developmental bottlenecks by easing the transfer of advanced state-backed R&D to designated private-sector companies such as SMEE.

== United States sanctions ==
In December 2022, as part of the United States' effort to impede Chinese development of advanced semiconductor equipment, the United States Department of Commerce added SMEE to the Bureau of Industry and Security's Entity List.

== See also ==
- ASML Holding
- Semiconductor Manufacturing International Corporation
