= Peduli Anak =

- Founders: Chaim Joel Fetter; Bjorn Dudok van Heel
- Type: NGO
- Registration No.: 7185803
- Founded: 2005
- Location: Schweitzerstraat 38, 2131 RG Hoofddorp, The Netherlands
- Area served: Indonesia
- Mission: To improve the living circumstances of children and enforces children's rights by providing education, accommodation, family care and medical- and legal aid.
- Revenue: 204.263 euro
- Program Services: 91,7% of donated money
- Website: Official website

Peduli Anak Foundation is an independent non-governmental organization founded in 2005 in the Netherlands and expanded to Indonesia in 2006. Their aim is to improve the lives of children and to protect their rights by providing education, accommodation, family care and medical and legal aid.

Over the past five years, they have been active mostly in Indonesia, where they developed and implemented various programs. With the subsidy and donations of the NCDO the Netherlands, the Turing Foundation (co-founded by the TomTom Company), the Van der Poel Charity Fund (executive vice president of Royal Philips Electronics and chairman of ASML) and many other enterprises and organisations, they constructed a large development centre for underprivileged children on a 1.5-hectare (3.7-acre) site situated on the island of Lombok. It consists of three children's homes, a primary school, a vocational school and a medical centre.
