= Critical Manufacturing =

Automation and manufacturing software company

Critical Manufacturing SA
- Type: Subsidiary
- Industry: manufacturing execution systems
- Founded: 2009
- Headquarters: Maia, Portugal
- Key people: Francisco Almada Lobo, CEO; Günter Lauber, Chairman; Adélio Fernandes, VP Technology
- Products: Critical Manufacturing MES
- Number of employees: 600 (2023)
- Parent: ASMPT
- Website: www.criticalmanufacturing.com

Critical Manufacturing is a subsidiary of ASMPT. It was founded in 2009 and is focused on providing automation and manufacturing software for high-tech industries, such as semiconductor, electronics, medical devices and industrial equipment. It has offices in Portugal, China, Germany, Malaysia, Mexico and USA. In 2018, it became a subsidiary of ASM Pacific Technology Limited.

== Products ==
The company flagship product is Critical Manufacturing MES, a next-generation manufacturing operations management system.

Critical Manufacturing MES uses technologies from Microsoft, providing an Internet application user experience.
