= Dongfang Jingyuan Electron Limited =

Chinese semiconductor equipment and software company

- Native name: 东方晶源微电子科技（北京）股份有限公司
- Company type: Private
- Industry: Semiconductors
- Founded: 2014; 12 years ago
- Founder: Yu Zongchang
- Headquarters: Beijing, China
- Website: www.dfjy-jx.com

Dongfang Jingyuan Electron Limited (DJEL; Chinese: 东方晶源; pinyin: Dōngfāng Jīngyuán) is a Chinese semiconductor equipment and software company that specializes in integrated circuit yield management.

== Background ==
In early 2014, former ASML employee Yu Zongchang founded two companies, DJEL in Beijing and Xtal in Silicon Valley. According to an attorney representing ASML, Yu was instructed by Han Jingyuan to create these companies. Han was chairman and CEO of China Oriental Group as well as holder of multiple roles in the Chinese Communist Party. According to Datenna, China Oriental Group through its subsidiaries owned more than 50% of DJEL until 2019 when it sold its stake to other investors.

In 2015, DJEL signed a research agreement with the Institute of Microelectronics of the Chinese Academy of Sciences. They created a joint venture for chip technology development.

In 2018, ASML sued Xtal and several employees for intellectual property theft. In the trial, ASML's attorney told the court that DJEL and Xtal worked together with the same goal of obtaining ASML's technology and transferring it to China to foster its own semiconductor industry. At the centre of the litigation was Optical proximity correction (OPC) software needed for lithography machines to print tiny circuits. One engineer was accused of stealing 2 million lines of source code for critical ASML software and then sharing it with DJEL and Xtal employees. Xtal lost and was ordered to pay $845 million. As a result, Xtal filed for bankruptcy. An arrest warrant was issued for Yu but he had already fled back to China.

Despite losing the Xtal case, the Chinese government granted DJEL a wide-ranging patent in 2019 that includes OPC software. In 2021, the Ministry of Industry and Information Technology announced that DJEL was named a "little giant", a designation often followed by significant new investment and expectations of rapid growth.

In its 2021 annual report, ASML mentioned that DJEL (which was affiliated with Xtal) was actively marketing products in China that could potentially infringe on ASML copyright. This was considered a risk factor to ASML. The Ministry of Foreign Affairs of the People's Republic of China called the allegations "malicious hype. ASML started investigation for evidence of intellectual property theft but has difficulties due to lack of response to its inquiries. ASML has told key customers not to aid DJEL in any way. DJEL stated its operations comply with relevant laws and regulations.

In May 2023, it was reported that DJEL was considering filing for an initial public offering as early as 2024. At the time. the company was valued at 8 billion yuan ($1.2 billion). One of the listing venues considered was the Shanghai Stock Exchange STAR Market.

In April 2024, DJEL completed another round of financing worth 1 billion yuan. Investors include Shenzhen Capital Group.

In December 2024, DJEL was targeted in a new round of US export controls and added to the United States Department of Commerce's Entity List.

== See also ==
- Semiconductor industry in China
- ASML Holding
