= Burn-Jeng Lin =

Taiwanese electrical engineer (born 1942)

Burn-Jeng Lin (Chinese: 林本堅; born June 24, 1942) also known as Burn J. Lin, is a Taiwanese electrical engineer and researcher in semiconductor device fabrication. He is known for his work on photolithography, particularly the development and industrial adoption of 193-nanometre immersion lithography, a manufacturing technique used to produce advanced integrated circuits. He previously worked at IBM and Taiwan Semiconductor Manufacturing Company (TSMC) and subsequently joined National Tsing Hua University as a distinguished research chair professor.

Lin's research has addressed the resolution limits of optical lithography, including deep-ultraviolet exposure, multilayer photoresist systems, phase-shifting masks, and optical imaging theory. During his tenure at TSMC, he advocated the use of water-based immersion lithography with existing 193-nm optical systems, helping establish the technology as an alternative to the industry's proposed transition to 157-nm lithography.

Lin was elected to the United States National Academy of Engineering in 2008 and Academia Sinica in 2014. His awards include the inaugural SPIE Frits Zernike Award in 2004, the IEEE Jun-ichi Nishizawa Medal in 2013, the Future Science Prize in Mathematics and Computer Science in 2018, and Taiwan's Presidential Innovation Award in 2024.

== Education ==
Lin grew up in Vietnam before moving to Taiwan during his secondary school education. He attended Hsinchu Senior High School, where he completed his studies before entering National Taiwan University. In a 2024 interview with CommonWealth Magazine, he discussed his upbringing and the influence of his secondary school principal, Hsin Chih-Ping, on his subsequent education.

He earned a bachelor's degree in electrical engineering from National Taiwan University in 1963. He then pursued graduate studies in the United States, receiving a PhD in electrical engineering from Ohio State University in 1970.

== Career ==
=== IBM and early lithography research ===
Lin joined IBM in 1970, working at the Thomas J. Watson Research Center and later in the company's semiconductor technology operations. During his employment, he held research and management positions concerned with optical lithography and semiconductor manufacturing.

His early research addressed limitations in the optical processes used to transfer circuit patterns onto semiconductor wafers. In 1975, he published "Deep UV Lithography" in the Journal of Vacuum Science and Technology, examining the use of shorter-wavelength ultraviolet light in semiconductor patterning.

Lin subsequently studied multilayer resist systems, partially coherent optical imaging, and the relationship between optical resolution and depth of focus. His publications contributed to the development of methods for evaluating the performance of projection lithography systems.

In 1987, Lin discussed immersion lithography as a potential method of improving optical resolution without requiring a corresponding reduction in the wavelength of the light source. The technique involved placing a liquid medium between the final optical element and the wafer surface, thereby increasing the effective numerical aperture of the imaging system.

Lin left IBM in 1992 and established Linnovation, Inc., a company focused on optical lithography technology and consulting.

=== Taiwan Semiconductor Manufacturing Company ===
In 2000, Lin joined Taiwan Semiconductor Manufacturing Company (TSMC) as a senior director. He subsequently became a vice president of research and development and was appointed a distinguished fellow of the company. He worked at TSMC until 2015.

At TSMC, Lin led research on semiconductor patterning technologies. His work included developing methods to improve lithographic resolution and manufacturing processes for increasingly small integrated-circuit features.

In the early 2000s, when semiconductor manufacturers were investigating 157-nm optical lithography and extreme ultraviolet lithography (EUV), Lin proposed extending existing 193-nm systems through immersion lithography. The approach used purified water between the projection lens and the wafer to increase optical resolution while retaining much of the established 193-nm optical infrastructure.

According to DigiTimes, Lin promoted the method in 2002, at a time when equipment manufacturers were investing in 157-nm lithography. His proposal contributed to TSMC's adoption of 193-nm immersion lithography for advanced semiconductor production.

TSMC demonstrated 90-nm static random-access memory using an immersion scanner in 2004 and subsequently developed immersion lithography processes for commercial chip manufacturing. The company's 2007 annual report identified Lin's proposal as an important step in its adoption of the technology.

Lin's research and management at TSMC continued through the development of smaller semiconductor process nodes. He retired from the company in 2015.

=== National Tsing Hua University ===
After leaving TSMC, Lin joined National Tsing Hua University (NTHU) in Hsinchu, Taiwan. In 2016, he became a distinguished research chair professor. He participated in establishing the university's College of Semiconductor Research and became its founding dean. Lin also served as director of the NTHU–TSMC Joint Research Center from 2018 to 2026. In 2026, he became its honorary director.

== Research and contributions ==
Lin's research has concentrated on the resolution and practical limitations of optical lithography. His publications address optical imaging theory, exposure and focus control, photomask technology, and the extension of ultraviolet lithography to smaller semiconductor feature dimensions.

=== Deep-ultraviolet lithography ===
Lin's early work included the application of deep-ultraviolet (DUV) radiation to semiconductor manufacturing. His 1975 paper "Deep UV Lithography" described the use of shorter ultraviolet wavelengths in the fabrication of integrated circuits.

He subsequently investigated multilayer photoresist systems designed to improve pattern transfer and resolution. In 1979, he published work on a portable conformable mask technique combining near-ultraviolet and deep-ultraviolet patterning. He also presented research on multilayer resist systems at the 1982 International Electron Devices Meeting.

=== Imaging theory and resolution enhancement ===
Lin worked on mathematical models of optical imaging and the influence of partially coherent illumination on semiconductor patterning. His 1980 paper in IEEE Transactions on Electron Devices examined two-dimensional partially coherent imaging and theoretical limits of projection printing.

He also developed approaches for characterising lithographic processes in terms of exposure and defocus. In 1994, he published the "Exposure-Defocus Forest" methodology, which presented a framework for analysing lithographic performance across different exposure and focus conditions.

Other research concerned resolution-scaling equations and phase-shifting mask techniques. In the early 1990s, Lin published studies of attenuated phase-shifting masks and their effects on optical lithography performance.

=== Immersion lithography ===
Lin is particularly associated with the development of immersion lithography for semiconductor manufacturing. In optical immersion lithography, a liquid with a refractive index greater than that of air is introduced between the final projection lens and the wafer. This increases the effective numerical aperture and allows smaller features to be printed using an existing light source.

Lin discussed the potential use of immersion optics in semiconductor manufacturing during the 1980s. In 2002, while working at TSMC, he advocated a practical implementation based on 193-nm ultraviolet light and purified water. The approach was intended to overcome resolution limitations while avoiding some of the technical difficulties associated with the planned introduction of 157-nm lithography.

The proposal differed from the prevailing industry approach, which focused on developing shorter-wavelength optical systems. Lin argued that using water as the immersion medium would permit existing 193-nm systems to operate at a higher numerical aperture, extending their applicability to smaller semiconductor features.

Lin subsequently published theoretical and technical studies of immersion lithography, including "Immersion Lithography and Its Impact on Semiconductor Manufacturing" in 2004. His work addressed the optical principles, potential performance improvements, and manufacturing considerations associated with the technology.

Immersion lithography became widely used in semiconductor manufacturing during the 2000s. It enabled chipmakers to continue employing 193-nm optical systems for technology generations that otherwise would have required major changes in lithographic equipment. The method was subsequently used in multiple generations of integrated circuits, including processes with feature sizes below 45 nm.

In 2018, the Future Science Prize in Mathematics and Computer Science recognised Lin's work in developing immersion lithography and its contribution to the continued scaling of integrated circuits.

=== Other lithography developments ===
Lin's research also included the study of optical proximity effects, numerical aperture optimisation, multilayer photoresist techniques, and approaches for evaluating the manufacturing performance of photolithography equipment.

He developed the exposure-defocus analysis software E-D Forest and Signamizer, tools used to study lithographic imaging and process conditions. These methods were related to his research on exposure latitude, depth of focus, and the optimisation of patterning processes.

Lin also contributed to discussions on the technical limitations of optical lithography as feature dimensions decreased. His later publications examined the continued role of immersion systems alongside emerging lithography methods, including extreme ultraviolet technology.

== Awards and recognition ==
- 2003 – Fellow, IEEE.
- 2003 – Fellow, SPIE.
- 2004 – SPIE Frits Zernike Award, inaugural recipient.
- 2008 – Elected member, United States National Academy of Engineering.
- 2009 – IEEE Cledo Brunetti Award.
- 2009 – Benjamin G. Lamme Meritorious Achievement Medal, Ohio State University.
- 2013 – IEEE Jun-ichi Nishizawa Medal.
- 2014 – Elected academician, Academia Sinica.
- 2018 – Future Science Prize in Mathematics and Computer Science.
- 2023 – SPIE Mozi Award.
- 2024 – Presidential Innovation Award, Taiwan.

== Selected publications ==
=== Books ===
- Lin, Burn Jeng (2021). Optical lithography: here is why (2nd ed.). Bellingham, Washington USA: SPIE. ISBN 978-1-5106-3995-9.
- Lin, Burn J. (2018). 把心放上去 (Commit for Success). Apocalypse Press. ISBN 9789869507066.

=== Selected research articles ===
- Lin, Burn Jeng (1975-11-01). "Deep uv lithography". Journal of Vacuum Science and Technology. 12 (6): 1317–1320. doi:10.1116/1.568527. ISSN 0022-5355.
- Lin, B.J. (1980). "Partially coherent imaging in two dimensions and the theoretical limits of projection printing in microfabrication". IEEE Transactions on Electron Devices. 27 (5): 931–938. doi:10.1109/t-ed.1980.19959. ISSN 0018-9383.
- Lin, Burn J. (1987). "The future of subhalf-micrometer optical lithography". Microelectronic Engineering. 6 (1–4): 31–51. doi:10.1016/0167-9317(87)90015-3. ISSN 0167-9317.
- Lin, B.J. (1992). "The optimum numerical aperture for attenuated phase-shifting masks". Microelectronic Engineering. 17 (1–4): 79–85. doi:10.1016/0167-9317(92)90017-l. ISSN 0167-9317.
- Burn J. Lin, Burn J. Lin (1994-12-01). "The Exposure-Defocus Forest". Japanese Journal of Applied Physics. 33 (12S): 6756. doi:10.1143/jjap.33.6756. ISSN 0021-4922.
- Lin, Burn J. (2002-04-01). "The k3 coefficient in non-paraxial (lambda)/NA scaling equations for resolution, depth of focus, and immersion lithography". Journal of Micro/Nanopatterning, Materials, and Metrology. 1 (1): 7–12. doi:10.1117/1.1445798. ISSN 2708-8340.
- Lin, Burn-Jeng (2004-05-28). Smith, Bruce W. (ed.). "Immersion lithography and its impact on semiconductor manufacturing". SPIE Proceedings. Optical Microlithography XVII. 5377. SPIE: 46. doi:10.1117/12.534507.
