= ASML =

Dutch photolithography company

ASML Holding N.V.

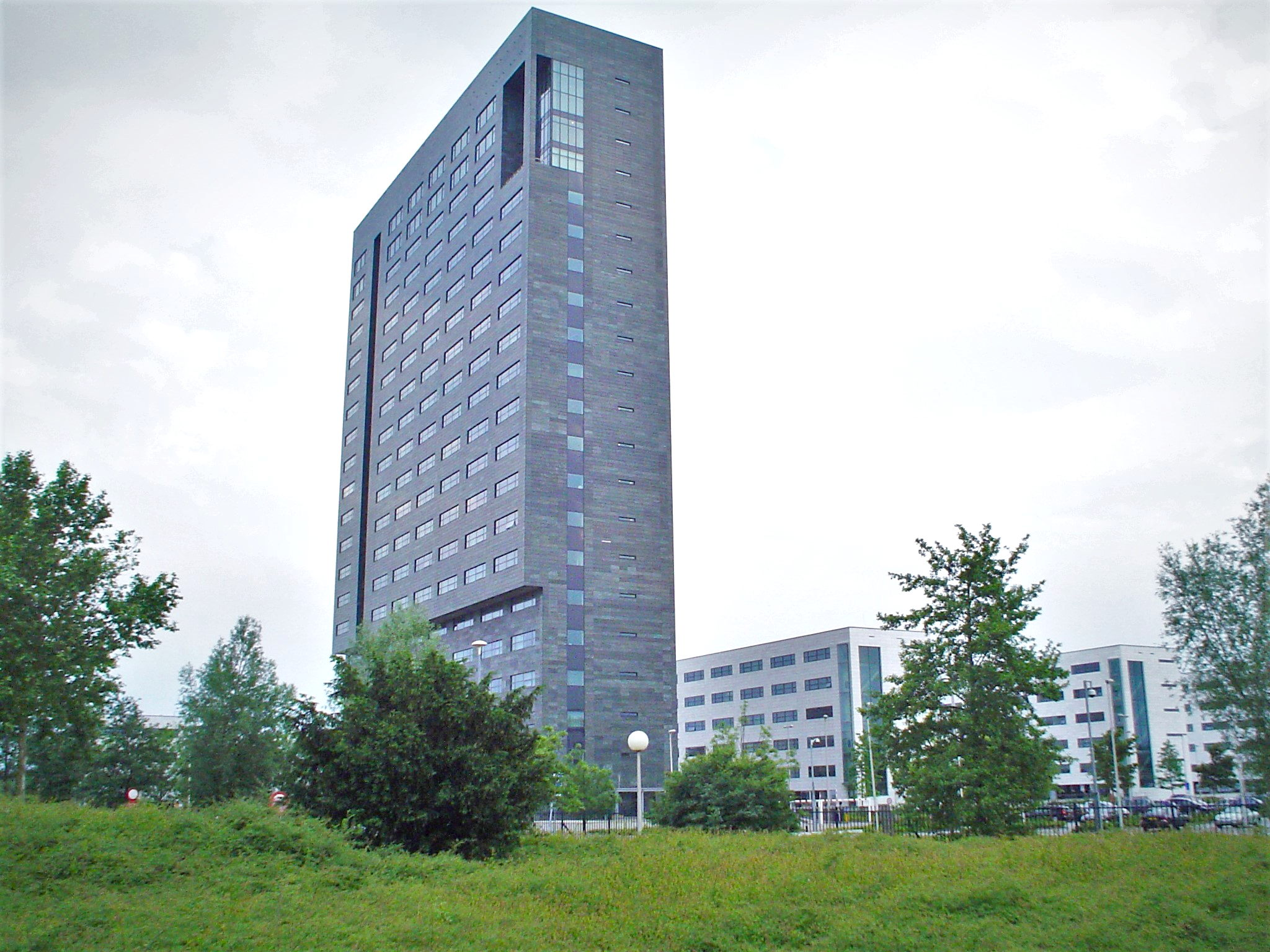
- Corporate headquarters in Veldhoven
- Type: Public
- Traded as: Euronext Amsterdam: ASML; AEX component; Nasdaq: ASML; Nasdaq-100 component
- Industry: Semiconductor industry
- Founded: 1984; 42 years ago (joint venture); 1988; 38 years ago (independent company)
- Founder: Philips
- Headquarters: Veldhoven, North Brabant, Netherlands
- Key people: Christophe Fouquet (CEO); Nils Andersen (chairman of the supervisory board)
- Products: Photolithography systems
- Revenue: ▲€32.7 billion (2025)
- Operating income: ▲€11.3 billion (2025)
- Net income: ▲€9.61 billion (2025)
- Total assets: ▲€50.6 billion (2025)
- Total equity: ▲€19.6 billion (2025)
- Number of employees: 44,175 (2025)
- Website: asml.com

ASML Holding N.V. (originally an abbreviation of Advanced Semiconductor Materials Lithography) is a Dutch multinational technology company that develops and manufactures photolithography machines used to produce integrated circuits. It is the largest supplier to the semiconductor industry and, as of 2026, the world's only manufacturer of extreme ultraviolet (EUV) lithography machines, which are required to manufacture the most advanced semiconductor chips. As of January 2026, ASML had a market capitalization of approximately $527 billion, making it Europe's largest technology company and one of its most valuable companies overall.

ASML was founded in 1984 as a joint venture between the Dutch technology companies Philips and ASM International and became an independent publicly traded company four years later. The company was established to complete development of a lithography machine that Philips had been developing internally, but initially had no market-ready products. ASML's first product, the PAS 2000, was a commercial and technical failure, but the company achieved commercial success in the early 1990s with the PAS 5500. By 2002, it had become the world's largest supplier of lithography machines.

Meanwhile, in 1997, ASML began developing its EUV lithography technology. To help fund the expensive research and development required, Intel invested $4.1 billion in ASML in July 2012 in exchange for a 15 percent stake. Samsung and TSMC subsequently acquired smaller stakes under the same co-investment program. ASML completed development of the first commercially viable EUV machines in the late 2010s. During the 2010s and 2020s, the governments of the Netherlands and the United States imposed increasingly stringent controls on ASML's sales of semiconductor manufacturing equipment to China, citing concerns including national security and the protection of advanced semiconductor technology.

ASML's corporate headquarters are in Veldhoven, near Eindhoven, in the Netherlands, where the company conducts research and development and manufactures and assembles its products. Additionally the company has offices in more than a dozen countries. ASML employs more than 42,000 people and has a network of nearly 5,000 direct suppliers.

== History ==
=== Background ===
ASML can be traced back to the 1970s and the Dutch electronics company Philips. The firm, having observed that the wider electronics industry had been struggling to shrink features without losing accuracy or letting contamination/flaws increase, decided to develop its own prototype lithography machines, harnessing Philips' established knowledge in the fields of optics and precision mechanics. By the early 1980s, Philips had projected that considerable additional investment would be necessary to complete its development, but this need came at a time in which the company was trying to reduce expenditure. Accordingly, in 1984, the company elected to spin-off its lithography machine activities into a joint venture with another Dutch firm, ASM International, which specialised in the supply of equipment to the semiconductor industry.

The new entity used a different business strategy to established competitors; lacking the capital, time, and expertise to realistically pursue vertical integration, instead, the joint venture opted to outsource various major components, including motors and optics, to other parties so that it could dedicate its resources and attention on the assembly and optimisation of the final machine. This decision shaped the machine as well, which adopted a modular design and used clearly defined subsystems. Early on, ASML struggled to secure business, having no market share and no brand recognition at the start of its operations. Furthermore, the firm's first product, the PAS 2000, was a commercial and technical failure, having used oil pressure (instead of electric motors) to move the wafer during exposure, which had a tendency to leak; future lithograph machines made by ASML would use conventional electric motors instead.

The design was improved shortly after, using electric motors and, as one of the first contribution of a newly hired Martin van den Brink, a grid profile to improve the precision of the alignment. The resulting PAS 2400 wasn't as accurate as ASML was hoping for, but it could expose 90 wafers per hour, and it was used as a demonstrator in 1985 to win a first contract with AMD that promised to deliver 25 machines by 1987. In 1986, the company, which had grown from 17 employees to over 200, delivered the first truly competitive wafer stepper to Philips: the PAS 2500. This model was the result of ASML's new policy of splitting the design into modular subsystems and outsourcing the manufacturing as much as possible; for instance, it was equipped with a standard lens from Carl Zeiss.

=== Independence and commercial breakout ===
By the start of 1988, Philips was reportedly considering shutting down the joint venture entirely after ASM International pulled out. However, sufficient support was present on Philip's board to continue with operations, giving ASML the time to develop another lithography machine, the PAS 5500. Accordingly, in 1988, ASML became an independent publicly traded entity; that same year, it first adopted the name ASML, which is its official name and not an abbreviation.

In 1991, ASML released the PAS 5500, which quickly became the company's first commercial breakout. In contrast to the more precise contemporary lithography machines from competing firm Nikon, the modular design used by ASML meant that its machines could be fixed quickly on site, reducing downtime and making it possible to extend the machine’s operating life. The serviceability advantage was reportedly the key factor that led to IBM ordering the PAS 5500 over its Japanese counterparts. The first company to operate the PAS 5500 was Micron Technology, one of the world's largest producers of computer memory and storage; it became ASML's largest customer for a time. The success of the PAS 5500 line propelled ASML into a period of intense competition with both Canon and Nikon, who were the leaders of the lithography market at the time.

In 1997, ASML began studying a shift to using extreme ultraviolet. Two years later, it joined a consortium, which included Intel and two other U.S. chipmakers, in order to exploit fundamental research conducted by the US Department of Energy. Because the Cooperative Research and Development Agreement (CRADA) it operates under is funded by the US government, licensing must be approved by Congress. Furthermore, in return for being permitted to join this consortium, ASML committed to the establishment of a US-based research center and to source 55 percent of components for all machines sold in the US from American suppliers. ASML collaborated with various manufacturers to obtain mirrors, including the Belgian firms IMEC and Sematech as well as Germany's Carl Zeiss.

=== 2000s ===
In 2001, ASML acquired the US-based lithography equipment manufacturer Silicon Valley Group (SVG) after it had encountered liquidity issues, The SVG acquisition, which has also been licensed for EUV research results, involved ASML in an arrangement to supply 193 nm scanners to Intel.

In 2002, it became the largest supplier of photolithography systems. Aided by the adoption of the dual-stage TWINSCAN architecture to reduce idle time, ASML machines could produce more chips per hour than any competitor's products; this competitive edge was so strong that the company could charge higher prices for their machines and still grow its market share. By the end of the decade, it had secured two thirds of the global lithography market and had become the dominant supplier for the growing smartphone market.

During December 2006, ASML announced the acquisition of rival firm BRION Technologies in exchange for $270 million; this transaction brought the company into direct competition with the major Electronic design automation (EDA) vendors who had similar products - Cadence Design Systems, Synopsys, and Mentor Graphics.

During late 2008, following the start of the Great Recession, ASML experienced a large drop in sales, which led management to cut the workforce by about 1000 worldwide, mainly at its headquarters in the Netherlands as well its Connecticut manufacturing plant; additionally, the firm applied for support from the Dutch national unemployment fund to prevent even larger layoffs. ASML had recovered by 2011, reporting record-high revenue for that year.

=== 2010s ===
During the early 2010s, ASML sharply increased its annual R&D budget, rising from just under $500 million in 2010 to $1 billion in 2015. While this expenditure was necessary in order to complete the development of its next generation EUV machines, financing such amounts was not straightforward. To achieve this, ASML launched a co-investment program in 2012, under which 23 percent of the company was sold to its three largest customers: Intel, TSMC and Samsung. Intel's investment of $4.1 billion into ASML, made in July 2012, gave it a 15 percent stake in the company; this move was stated to accelerate Intel's transition from 300 mm to 450 mm wafers as well as support further development of EUV lithography. That same month, ASML offered another 10 percent of its shares to other companies.

Beyond simply generating additional funds, these new stakeholders were incentivised to participate in ASML's research efforts. TSMC in particular worked closely with ASML to develop and troubleshoot its EUV machines, being keen to use them to manufacture their own products. As part of their EUV strategy, ASML announced the acquisition of DUV and EUV sources manufacturer Cymer in exchange for $2.55 billion in October 2012; this transaction was completed in May 2013. Cymer's technology was viewed as being useful to developing ASML's EUV machines.

In November 2013, ASML paused development of 450 mm lithography equipment, citing uncertain timing of chipmaker demand.

In early 2015, ASML reported an instance of intellectual property theft; allegedly a number of employees had been found stealing confidential data from its Silicon Valley software subsidiary that develops software for machine optimization. Three years later, ASML was awarded $223 million in damages pertaining to this incident, as well as securing the offending company's own intellectual property. ASML employees have often been viewed as highly desirable recruitment targets for other tech companies.

In June 2016, ASML announced their plans to acquire Taiwan-based Hermes Microvision Inc. in exchange for about $3.1 billion; it was reported that this transaction would secure technology for creating smaller and more advanced semiconductors.

In 2018, the Trump administration tried to block the sale of ASML technology to China. This move, which has been viewed as part of a wider "technological cold war" between the US and China, may have contributed to the 2020–2023 global chip shortage and impacted the business opportunities available to ASML.

=== 2020s ===
Throughout the late 2010s and early 2020s, ASML experienced a period of steady revenue growth, rising from $13 billion in 2018 up to $35 billion in 2024; this has been largely credited to the firm's EUV machines, which have received a significant surge in demand during this period, driven by modern electronics' increasing complexity and performance requirements. In July 2020, ASML stated that it had acquired the German optical glassmaking firm Berliner Glas Group, which will help to satisfy the increasing need for components for its EUV systems; at the time of this acquisition, ASML's outstanding orders had reportedly risen to €10 billion.

In July 2021, European Commissioner Thierry Breton, visited ASML and announced a goal of at least 20 percent of global production of semiconductors in Europe by 2030, and support via a European Alliance on semiconductors. After reporting earnings in July 2021, the company said they had a near monopoly for machines used by TSMC and Samsung to make the advanced chips.

In February 2023, ASML claimed that a former worker in China "allegedly" stole information about the company's technology. This was not the first time that ASML was allegedly linked with an intellectual property breach connected to China. In its 2021 annual report, ASML mentioned that Dongfang Jingyuan Electron Limited "was actively marketing products in China that could potentially infringe on ASML's IP rights." At the time, the United States Department of Commerce expressed concern about economic espionage against ASML. In October 2023, Dutch newspaper NRC Handelsblad reported that the former employee who "allegedly" stole data about ASML's technology subsequently went to work for Huawei.

In March 2023, the Dutch government placed restrictions on chip equipment exports in order to protect national security. This measure affected ASML as one of the most important companies in the global microchip supply chain. Export license requirements came into effect in September 2023. Three months later, the Netherlands' Institute for Human Rights ruled that despite the country's constitution prohibiting discrimination based on nationality, ASML was allowed to reject job applications from residents of countries subject to sanctions under the U.S. Export Administration Regulations (such as China, Cuba, Iran, North Korea, and Syria) in order to remain compliant with U.S. law.

In January 2024, the Dutch government placed further restrictions on the shipment of some advanced chip-making equipment to China. On 6 September 2024, the Dutch government tightened export controls on certain ASML chipmaking equipment, aligning its policy with U.S. restrictions to limit China's access to advanced technology amid safety and geopolitical concerns. These restrictions were expanded for tighter export controls in January 2025, with ASML required to apply for export licenses with the Dutch government instead of the U.S. In December 2025, Reuters reported that China had secretly built a prototype EUV machine in Shenzhen with the assistance of former ASML engineers, with the machine expected to produce working chips between 2028 and 2030.

== Products ==
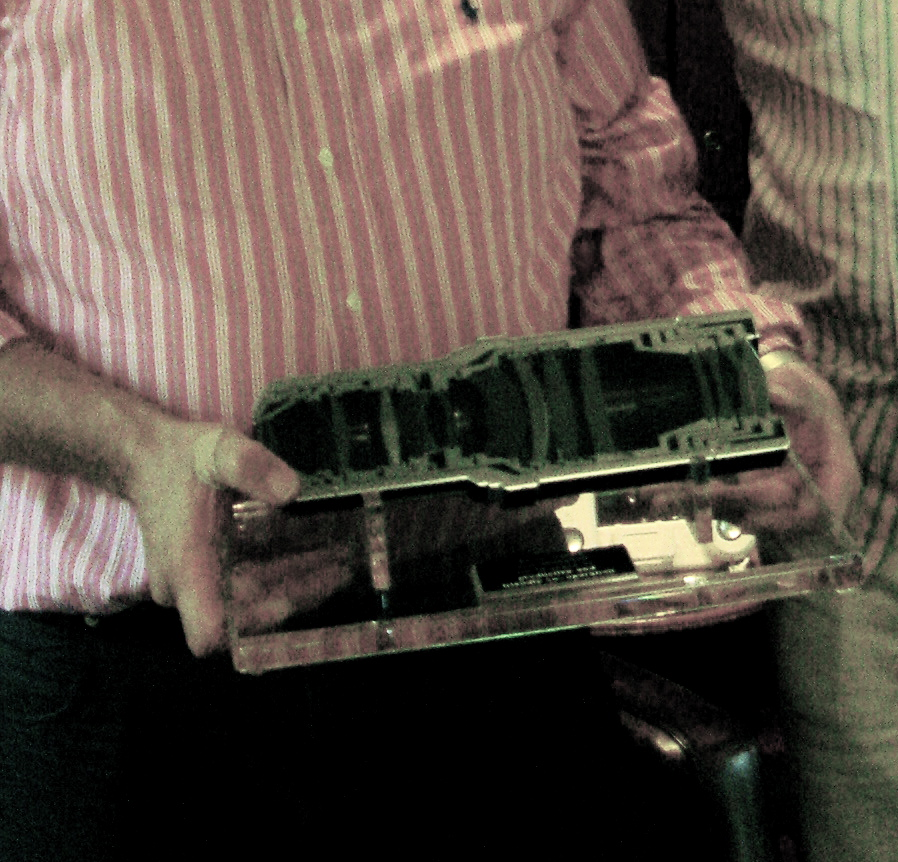
A diagonally cut ASML lens

ASML produces the photolithography machines used in the production of integrated circuits, called "scanners". In these machines, patterns are optically imaged onto a silicon wafer that is covered with a film of light-sensitive material (photoresist). This procedure is repeated dozens of times on a single wafer. The photoresist is then further processed to create the actual electronic circuits on the silicon. The optical imaging that ASML's machines deal with is used in the fabrication of nearly all integrated circuits. As of 2025, ASML had 83% percent of the worldwide sales of lithography machines.

ASML's earlier competition consisted of Ultratech, Canon, Nikon, MKS Instruments, Lam Research and Cadence Design Systems.

=== Immersion lithography ===
Since immersion lithography was first proposed by Burn-Jeng Lin in the 1970s, ASML cooperated with TSMC. In 2004, TSMC began commercial production of 90 nanometer semiconductor nodes using ASML immersion lithography. By 2011, their high-end TWINSCAN NXT:1950i system was used for producing features down to 32 nanometres at up to 200 wafers per hour, using a water immersion lens and an argon fluoride laser that produces light at a wavelength of 193 nm. By 2011, an average lithography machine cost €27 million.

=== DUV lithography ===
Deep ultraviolet lithography (DUV) devices from ASML use ultraviolet light to print the tiny features that form the microchip's structure.

=== EUV lithography ===
Extreme ultraviolet lithography (EUV) is a critical technology used to create the smallest and most complex chip designs. ASML holds a near-monopoly in the EUV market. The company's machines are capable of exposing patterns as small as 8 nanometers wide, about 1/10,000 the width of a human hair.

EUV machines produce light in the 13.5 nm wavelength range by focusing a high-energy laser on microscopic droplets of molten tin to produce a plasma, which then emits EUV light. The molten tin is fired out of a nozzle at 66m/s, and each droplet is hit thrice by a laser: the first is a low powered hit to flatten the droplets, the second to rarefy them, and the third to ionise them, thus emitting the EUV. This occurs in a near vacuum with trace hydrogen gas, which reabsorbs the tin and allows it to be filtered away.

The light is then bounced off Zeiss mirrors onto the surface of a silicon wafer to form the designs for the chip.

In 2009, the IMEC research center in Belgium produced the world's first functional 22 nm CMOS Static random-access memory memory cells with a prototype EUV lithography machine. ASML shipped the first pre-production EUV machine in 2013 and, after two decades of development, started shipping production EUV machines in 2018. Samsung shipped the first EUV-enabled commercial product in 2019.

As of 2022, ASML has shipped around 140 EUV systems. ASML's best-selling EUV product has been the TWINSCAN NXE:3600D, which costs up to $200 million. The machine weighs 180 tons and needs three Boeing 747s to transport.

ASML is working on the next generation of EUV systems, with the first shipments for R&D shipped to Intel in December 2023, and TSMC in late 2024. The platform is designated High-NA as it increases the numerical aperture (NA) from 0.33 to 0.55. each system costs approximately $370 million.

== Sponsorships ==
ASML became a sponsor of the PSV football club in 2019 together with Philips, VDL Groep, Royal Swinkels Family Brewers and Jumbo Supermarkets from the Brainport region. Together they run various initiatives like soccer training camps for school children, the development of interactive programs for teaching, assisting community members in need or who are new to the region, as well as supporting a vitality program that is online. ASML has been the title partner of the Eindhoven Marathon since 2022.

== Awards ==
- The IEEE Spectrum Emerging Technology 2018 Award was given to ASML for its Extreme Ultraviolet Lithography system. ASML is currently the top supplier of photolithography systems to the semiconductor industry.
- In the category for Popular Prize, Vadim Banine received the 2018 European Inventor Award for shaping the future of microchip manufacturing.
- The largest independent microelectronics research center in Europe is called IMEC (Interuniversity Micro Electronics Centre). Martin van den Brink of ASML was given the 2019 IMEC Lifetime of Innovation Award.
- The Netherlands Association for Investor Relations (NEVIR), where listed companies and professionals in investor relations had the chance to be recognized for their outstanding work in the sector, presented awards to ASML in the categories: "Best Company in the field of Investor Relations" during the Dutch IR Awards 2019 annual award ceremony.
- ASML received the SEMI Americas Award at the 2020 edition of the microelectronics conference SEMICON West for its collaborative approach to extreme ultraviolet lithography (EUV), which helped it become commercially viable and opened the door to new technological possibilities.
- The Intel Preferred Quality Supplier (PQS) Award for 2020 was awarded to ASML. ASML has attained a level of performance that continuously surpasses Intel's expectations for the commitment to continual quality improvement.
- The Dutch Innovation Prize 2021 was awarded to ASML at the 4th National BID AVROTROS Innovation Dinner held at Kasteel Wittenburg in Wassenaar.
- ASML received the first CoSta Award for the most successful and impactful innovative partnership between a corporate company and a startup.

== See also ==
- Free electron laser (FEL)
- Energy recovery linac (ERL)
- Steady-state microbunching (SSMB)
- Zeiss
- Tokyo Electron
- Applied Materials
- Changchun Institute of Optics, Fine Mechanics and Physics (CIOMP)
- Advanced Micro-Fabrication Equipment (AMEC)
- IMEC
