= List of semiconductor fabrication plants =

Fabs present & past worldwide

Semiconductor fabrication plants are factories where wafers containing integrated circuits (ICs) are manufactured using a wafer fabrication process. They are either operated by integrated device manufacturers (IDMs) that design and manufacture ICs in-house and may also manufacture designs from design-only (fabless firms), or by pure play foundries that manufacture designs from fabless companies and do not design their own ICs. Some pure play foundries like TSMC offer IC design services, and others, like Samsung, design and manufacture ICs for customers, while also designing, manufacturing and selling their own ICs.

== Glossary of terms ==
- Wafer size – largest wafer diameter that a facility is capable of processing. (Semiconductor wafers are circular.)
- Process technology node – size of the smallest features that the facility is capable of etching onto the wafers.
- Production capacity – a manufacturing facility's nameplate capacity. Generally max wafers produced per month.
- Utilization – the number of wafers that a manufacturing plant processes in relation to its production capacity.
- Technology/products – Type of product that the facility is capable of producing, as not all plants can produce all products on the market.

== Open plants ==
Operating fabs include foundries from TSMC, GlobalFoundries, Silex Microsystems, Tower Semiconductor, Advanced Micro Foundry, VTT, SilTerra and IHP Microelectronics amongst others.

Company	Plant name	Plant location	Plant cost (in US$ billions)	Started production	Wafer size (mm)	Process technology node (nm)	Production capacity (Wafers/Month)	Technology / products
Teledyne Technologies	Teledyne Micralyne	Canada, Edmonton, Ontario		1982				Foundry, MEMS
Teledyne Technologies	Teledyne DALSA	Canada, Brompton, Quebec		2002	150, 200			Foundry, MEMS, CCD
STMicroelectronics		France, Crolles		2003	200, 300	28, 55, 65		Foundry, SiGe BiCMOS, FD-SOI
STMicroelectronics	AG200, AG300	Italy, Agrate Brianza			200, 300			Foundry, MEMS
nLIGHT		United States, Washington, Vancouver		2001				Laser diodes
Safran Sensing Technologies Switzerland (formerly Colibrys)		Switzerland, Yverdon-les-Bains			150			Foundry, MEMS
Pure Wafer		United States, Arizona, Prescott						Foundry
EM Microelectronic		Switzerland, Laténa		1975		180, 110		Foundry, microcontrollers, ASIC, RFID, smart cards
UMC – He Jian	Fab 8N	China, Suzhou	0.750, 1.2, +0.5	2003, May	200	4000–1000, 500, 350, 250, 180, 110	77,000	Foundry
UMC	Fab 6A	Taiwan, Hsinchu	0.35	1989	150	450	31,000	Foundry
UMC	Fab 8AB	Taiwan, Hsinchu	1	1995	200	250	67,000	Foundry
UMC	Fab 8C	Taiwan, Hsinchu	1	1998	200	350–110	37,000	Foundry
UMC	Fab 8D	Taiwan, Hsinchu	1.5	2000	200	90	31,000	Foundry
UMC	Fab 8E	Taiwan, Hsinchu	0.96	1998	200	180	37,000	Foundry
UMC	Fab 8F	Taiwan, Hsinchu	1.5	2000	200	150	40,000	Foundry
UMC	Fab 8S	Taiwan, Hsinchu	0.8	2004	200	350–250	31,000	Foundry
UMC	Fab 12A	Taiwan, Tainan	4.65, 4.1, 6.6, 7.3	2001, 2010, 2014, 2017	300	28, 14	87,000	Foundry
UMC	Fab 12i	Singapore	3.7	2004	300	130–40	53,000	Foundry
UMC – United Semiconductor	Fab 12X	China, Xiamen	6.2	2016	300	55–28	19,000-25,000 (2021)	Foundry
UMC – USJC (formerly MIFS) (formerly Fujitsu)	Fab 12M (original Fujitsu installations)	Japan, Mie Prefecture		1974	150, 200, 300	90–40	33,000	Foundry
Texas Instruments	Miho	Japan, Ibaraki, Miho			200	350, 250	40,000	Analog, DLP
Texas Instruments (formerly Spansion)	Aizu	Japan, Fukushima, Aizuwakamatsu			200			Analog
Texas Instruments (formerly National Semiconductor)	MFAB	United States, Maine, South Portland	0.932	1997	200	350, 250, 180		Analog
Texas Instruments (formerly Micron) (formerly IM Flash)	LFAB	United States, Utah, Lehi	1.3 (+ 3–4, future)		300	65–45	70,000	Analog, mixed signal, logic NAND FLASH (former), 3D XPoint (former)
Texas Instruments	RFAB1	United States, Texas, Richardson		2009	300	250, 180	20,000	Analog
Texas Instruments	RFAB2	United States, Texas, Richardson		2022	300			Analog
Texas Instruments	DMOS5	United States, Texas, Dallas		1984	200	250, 180		Analog, DLP
Texas Instruments	DMOS6	United States, Texas, Dallas		2000	300	130–45	22,000	Logic, Analog
Texas Instruments	DFAB	United States, Texas, Dallas		1966	150, 200			Mixed Signal, Analog
Texas Instruments	SFAB	United States, Texas, Sherman		1965	150			Analog
Texas Instruments	FFAB	Germany, Bavaria, Freising			200	1000, 180	37,500 (450,000 per year)	Analog
Texas Instruments (formerly SMIC – Cension)	CFAB	China, Chengdu			200		30,000	Analog
Tsinghua Unigroup		China, Nanjing	10 (first phase), 30	Planned	300		100,000 (first phase)	3D NAND
Tsinghua Unigroup – XMC (formerly Xinxin)	Fab 1	China, Wuhan	1.9	2008	300	90, 65, 60, 50, 45, 40, 32	30,000	Foundry, NOR
Tsinghua Unigroup – Yangtze Memory Technologies (YMTC) – XMC (formerly Xinxin)	Fab 2	China, Wuhan	24	2018	300	20	200,000	3D NAND
ChangXin Memory – (formerly Innotron Memory)	Fab 1	China, Hefei	8	2019	300	19	20,000–40,000	DRAM
SMIC	S1 Mega Fab (S1A/S1B/S1C)	China, Shanghai			200	350–90	115,000	Foundry
SMIC	S2 (Fab 8)	China, Shanghai			300	45/40–32/28	20,000	Foundry
SMIC – SMSC	SN1	China, Shanghai	10	2020	300	14	70,000	Foundry
SMIC	B1 Mega Fab (Fab 4, Fab 6)	China, Beijing		2004	300	180–90/55	52,000	Foundry
SMIC	B2A	China, Beijing	3.59	2014	300	45/40–32/28	41,000	Foundry
SMIC	Fab 15	China, Shenzhen		2014	200	350–90	55,000	Foundry
SMIC	Fab 7	China, Tianjin		2004	200	350–90	60,000	Foundry
SMIC	Jingcheng	China, Beijing	7.7	Under construction	300	28	100,000	Foundry
SMIC	Lingang	China, Shanghai	8.87	Under construction	300	28	100,000	Foundry
SMIC	Shenzhen	China, Shenzhen	2.35	Under construction	300	28	40,000	Foundry
SMIC	Xiqing	China, Tianjin	7.5	Under construction	300	28	100,000	Foundry
Wuxi Xichanweixin (formerly SMIC – LFoundry) (formerly LFoundry) (formerly Micron) (formerly Texas Instruments)	LF	Italy, Abruzzo, Avezzano		1995	200	180–90	40,000	
Nanya	Fab 2	Taiwan, Linkou	0.8	2000	200	175	30,000	DRAM
Nanya	Fab 3A	Taiwan, New Taipei City	1.85	2018	300	70-20	34,000	DRAM
Nanya		Taiwan, New Taipei City	10.66	Under construction	300	10	15,000–45,000	DRAM
MESA+ Institute	NANOLAB	Netherlands, Enschede						Academic research, R&D activities, pilot production for MEMS, Photonics, Microfluidics
Micron	Fab 4	United States, Idaho, Boise			300			R&D
Micron (formerly Dominion Semiconductor)	Fab 6	United States, Virginia, Manassas		1997	300	25	70,000	DRAM, NAND FLASH, NOR
Micron (formerly TECH Semiconductor)	Fab 7 (formerly TECH Semiconductor, Singapore)	Singapore			300		60,000	NAND FLASH
Micron (formerly IM Flash)	Fab 10	Singapore	3	2011	300	25	140,000	NAND FLASH
Micron (formerly Inotera)	Fab 11	Taiwan, Taoyuan			300	20 and under	125,000	DRAM
Micron	Fab 13	Singapore			200			NOR
Micron		Singapore			200			NOR Flash
Micron	Micron Semiconductor Asia	Singapore						
Micron		China, Xi'an						
Micron (formerly Elpida Memory)	Fab 15 (formerly Elpida Memory, Hiroshima)	Japan, Hiroshima			300	20 and under	100,000	DRAM
Micron (formerly Rexchip)	Fab 16 (formerly Rexchip, Taichung)	Taiwan, Taichung			300	30 and under	80,000	DRAM, FEOL
Micron (formerly Cando)	Micron Memory Taiwan	Taiwan, Taichung		?, 2018	300			DRAM, BEOL
Micron	A3	Taiwan, Taichung		Under construction	300			DRAM
Intel	D1B	United States, Oregon, Hillsboro		1996	300	22, 14, 10		Microprocessors
Intel	D1C	United States, Oregon, Hillsboro		2001	300	22, 14, 10		Microprocessors
Intel	D1D	United States, Oregon, Hillsboro		2003	300	14, 10, 7		Microprocessors
Intel	D1X	United States, Oregon, Hillsboro		2013	300	14, 10, 7		Microprocessors
Intel	Fab 12	United States, Arizona, Chandler		1996	300	65, 22, 14		Microprocessors & chipsets
Intel	Fab 32	United States, Arizona, Chandler	3	2007	300	45		
Intel	Fab 32	United States, Arizona, Chandler		2007	300	32, 22		Microprocessors
Intel	Fab 42	United States, Arizona, Chandler	10	2020	300	10, 7		Microprocessors
Intel	Fab 52, 62	United States, Arizona, Chandler	20	2024				Microprocessors
Intel	Fab 11x	United States, New Mexico, Rio Rancho		2002	300	45, 32		Microprocessors
Intel (formerly Micron) (formerly Numonyx) (formerly Intel)	Fab 18	Israel, Southern District, Kiryat Gat		1996	200, 300	180, 90, 65, 45		Microprocessors and chipsets, NOR flash
Intel	Fab 10	Ireland, County Kildare, Leixlip		1994	300			
Intel	Fab 14	Ireland, County Kildare, Leixlip		1998	300			
Intel	Fab 24	Ireland, County Kildare, Leixlip		2004	300	90, 65, 14		Microprocessors, Chipsets and Comms
Intel	Fab 28	Israel, Southern District, Kiryat Gat		2008	300	45, 22, 10		Microprocessors
Intel	Fab 38	Israel, Southern District, Kiryat Gat		Under construction	300			Microprocessors
Intel	Fab 68	China, Dalian	2.5	2010	300	65	30,000–52,000	Microprocessors (former), VNAND
Costa Rican Ministry of Innovation, Science, Technology and Telecommunications	Centro de Exelencia, Distrito Tecnologico T24	Costa Rica, San Jose, San Jose	0.5	Under Construction	300	20 and under		Research on Foundry, AI BEOL & microprocessors
Tower Semiconductor (formerly Maxim) (formerly Philips) (formerly VLSI)	Fab 9	United States, Texas, San Antonio		2003	200	180	28,000	Foundry, Al BEOL, Power, RF Analog
Tower Semiconductor (formerly National Semiconductor)	Fab 1	Israel, Northern District, Migdal HaEmek	0.235	1989, 1986	150	1000–350	14,000	Foundry, Planarized BEOL, W and Oxide CMP, CMOS, CIS, Power, Power Discrete
Tower Semiconductor	Fab 2	Israel, Northern District, Migdal HaEmek	1.226	2003	200	180–130	51,000	Foundry, Cu and Al BEOL, EPI, 193 nm Scanner, CMOS, CIS, Power, Power Discrete, MEMS, RFCMOS
Tower Semiconductor (formerly Jazz Technologies) (formerly Conexant) (formerly Rockwell)	Fab 3, Newport Beach	United States, California, Newport Beach	0.165	1967, 1995	200	500-130	25,000	Foundry, Al BEOL, SiGe, EPI
Tower Semiconductor – TPSCo (formerly Panasonic)	Fab 5, Tonami	Japan, Tonami		1994	200	500–130		Foundry, Analog/Mixed-Signal, Power, Discrete, NVM, CCD
Tower Semiconductor – TPSCo (formerly Panasonic)	Fab 7, Uozu	Japan, Uozu		1984	300	65. 45		Foundry, CMOS, CIS, RF SOI, Analog/Mixed-Signal
Tower Semiconductor – TPSCo (formerly Panasonic)	Fab 6, Arai	Japan, Arai		1976	200	130–110		Foundry, Analog/Mixed-Signal, CIS, NVM,Thick Cu RDL
Nuvoton	Fab2	Taiwan, Hsinchu			150	1000-350	45,000	Generic Logic, Mixed Signal (Mixed Mode), High Voltage, Ultra High Voltage, Power Management, Mask ROM (Flat Cell), Embedded Logic, Non-Volatile Memory, IGBT, MOSFET, Biochip, TVS, Sensor
ISRO	SCL	India, Mohali		2006	200	180		MEMS, CMOS, CCD, N.S.
STAR-C	MEMS	India, Bangalore		1996	150	1000–500		MEMS
STAR-C	CMOS	India, Bangalore		1996	150	1000–500		CMOS
GAETEC	GaAs	India, Hyderabad		1996	150	700–500		MESFET
BAE Systems (formerly Sanders)		United States, New Hampshire, Nashua		1985	100, 150	140, 100, 70, 50		MMIC, GaAs, GaN-on-SiC, foundry
Qorvo (formerly RF Micro Devices)		United States, North Carolina, Greensboro			100,150	500	8,000	SAW filters, GaAs HBT, GaAs pHEMT, GaN
Qorvo (formerly TriQuint Semiconductor) (formerly Micron) (formerly Texas Instruments) (formerly TwinStar Semiconductor)		United States, Texas, Richardson	0.5	1996	100, 150, 200	350, 250, 150, 90	8,000	DRAM (former), BAW filters, power amps, GaAs pHEMT, GaN-on-SiC
Qorvo (formerly TriQuint Semiconductor)		United States, Oregon, Hillsboro			100, 150	500		Power amps, GaAs
Apple (formerly Maxim) (formerly Samsung)	X3	United States, California, San Jose		?, 1997, 2015		600–90		
Analog Devices (formerly Maxim Integrated)	MaxFabNorth	United States, Oregon, Beaverton	(+1, future)					
Rohm (formerly Renesas)	Shiga Factory	Japan			200	150		IGBT, MOSFET, MEMS
Rohm (Lapis Semiconductor)(formerly Oki Semiconductor)(Oki Electric Industry)	Miyasaki	Japan				150		MEMS
Rohm (Lapis Semiconductor)	Building No.1	Japan		1961				Transistors
Rohm (Lapis Semiconductor)	Building No.2	Japan		1962				Transistors
Rohm (Lapis Semiconductor)	Building No.3	Japan		1962				Transistors
Rohm (Lapis Semiconductor)	Building No.4	Japan		1969				Transistors
Rohm (Lapis Semiconductor)	Chichibu Plant	Japan		1975				DRAM
Rohm (Lapis Semiconductor)	VLSI Laboratory No. 1	Japan		1977				VLSI
Rohm (Lapis Semiconductor)	VLSI Laboratory No. 2	Japan		1983				
Rohm (Lapis Semiconductor)	VLSI Laboratory No. 3	Japan		1983				DRAM
Rohm (Lapis Semiconductor)		Thailand		1992				
Rohm (Lapis Semiconductor)	ULSI Laboratory No. 1	Japan		1992		500		DRAM
Rohm (Kionix) (formerly Renesas Kyoto)	Kyoto	Japan, Kyoto			200			MEMS
Fuji Electric	Hokuriku	Japan, Toyama prefecture						
Fuji Electric	Matsumoto	Japan, Nagano prefecture			100, 150	2000–1000	20,000	CMOS. BiCMOS, bipolar, ASICs, discrete
Fujitsu	Kawasaki	Japan, Kawasaki		1966				
Fujitsu	Kumagaya Plant	Japan, Saitama, 1224 Oaza-Nakanara, Kumagaya-shi, 360-0801		1974				
Fujitsu	Suzaka Plant	Japan, Nagano, 460 Oaza-Koyama, Suzaka-shi, 382-8501						
Dynex Semiconductor		Lincoln, United Kingdom		1956	101.6, 150			Power Semiconductors
Denso (formerly Fujitsu)	Iwate Plant	Japan, Iwate, 4-2 Nishinemoriyama, Kanegasaki-cho, Isawa-gun, 029-4593			125, 150, 200	1500–350	100,000	CMOS, MOS, bipolar
Denso	Denso Iwate	Japan, Iwate Prefecture, Kanegasaki-cho	0.088	Under construction, 2019, May (planned)				Semiconductor wafers and sensors (since June 2017)
Canon Inc.	Oita	Japan						
Canon Inc.	Kanagawa	Japan						
Canon Inc.	Ayase	Japan						
Sharp Corporation	Fukuyama	Japan			125, 150, 200	1000, 800, 600	85,000	CMOS
Japan Semiconductor	Iwate	Japan						
Japan Semiconductor	Oita	Japan						
Japan Advanced Semiconductor Manufacturing, Inc	Kumamoto	Japan	20+	2024	300	40, 22/28, 12/16 and 6/7	100,000+	
Kioxia	Yokkaichi Operations	Japan, Yokkaichi		1992			173,334	Flash Memory
Kioxia/SanDisk	Y5 Phase 1 (at Yokkaichi Operations)	Japan, 800 Yamanoisshikicho, Yokkaichi, Mie		2011				Flash
Kioxia/SanDisk	Y5 Phase 2 (at Yokkaichi Operations)	Japan, Mie		2011	300	15		Flash
Kioxia	Y3 (at Yokkaichi Operations)	Japan, Yokkaichi			300			NAND Memory
Kioxia	Y4 (at Yokkaichi Operations)	Japan, Yokkaichi		2007	300			NAND Memory
Kioxia	Kaga Toshiba	Japan, Ishikawa						Power semiconductor devices
Kioxia	Oita Operations	Japan, Kyushu						
Kioxia	Y6 (phase 1) (at Yokkaichi Operations)	Japan, Yokkaichi	1.6, 1.7, 1.8 (estimates) (combined costs of installation of equipment at Phase 1 and construction of Phase 2)	2018	300			BiCS FLASH™
Kioxia	Y6 (phase 2) (at Yokkaichi Operations)	Japan, Yokkaichi	1.6, 1.7, 1.8 (estimates) (combined costs of installation of equipment at Phase 1 and construction of Phase 2)	Planned	300			BiCS FLASH™
Kioxia	Y7	Japan, Yokkaichi	4.6	Planned	300			BiCS FLASH™
Kioxia	Y2 (at Yokkaichi Operations)	Japan, Yokkaichi		1995				3D NAND
Kioxia	New Y2 (at Yokkaichi Operations)	Japan, Yokkaichi		2016, July 15	300			3D NAND
Kioxia	K1	Japan, Iwate Prefecture		Under construction	300			3D NAND
MinebeaMitsumi	Rinkai Factory	Japan, 5-2-2, Omikacho, Hitachi-shi, Ibaraki, 319–1221						MEMS Foundry
MinebeaMitsumi	Haramachi Factory	Japan, 20 Aza Oohara, Shimo-Ota, Haramachi-ku, Minamisouma-shi, Fukushima, 975-0041						Power semiconductors
Hitachi Energy (Formerly ABB)	Lenzburg	Switzerland, Aargau, Lenzburg	0.140	2010 (second phase)	130, 150		18,750	High power semiconductors, diodes, IGBT, BiMOS
Mitsubishi Electric	Power Device Works, Kunamoto Site	Japan			100, 125, 150, 200	2000–400	122,000	Power semiconductors
Mitsubishi Electric	High frequency optical device manufacturing plant	Japan, Hyogo Prefecture			100, 125		30,000	High frequency semiconductor devices (GaAsFET, GaN, MMIC)
Powerchip Semiconductor	Memory Foundry, Fab P1	Taiwan, Hsinchu	2.24	2002	300	90, 70, 22	80,000	Foundry, Memory IC, LCD drive IC, Integrated Memory Chips, CMOS Image Sensors, and Power Management IC
Powerchip Semiconductor	Fab P2	Taiwan, Hsinchu, Hsinchu Science Park	1.86	2005	300	90, 70, 22	80,000	Foundry, Memory IC, LCD drive IC, Integrated Memory Chips, CMOS Image Sensors, and Power Management IC
Powerchip Semiconductor (formerly Macronix)	Fab P3	Taiwan, Hsinchu, Hsinchu Science Park			300	90, 70, 22	20,000	Foundry, Memory IC, LCD drive IC, Integrated Memory Chips, CMOS Image Sensors, and Power Management IC
SPIL (formerly ProMOS)	ProMOS Fab 4	Taiwan, Taichung	1.6		300	70		Advanced Packaging
Macronix (formerly ProMOS)	Fab 5	Taiwan, Hsinchu			300		50,000	
Macronix	Fab 2	Taiwan			200		48,000	
Hon Young Semiconductor (formerly Macronix)	Fab 1				150	800-400	40,000	Foundry, SiC, Automotive MOSFETs, MEMS
Renesas	Naka Factory	Japan		2009	300	28		
Renesas	Takasaki Factory	Japan, 111, Nishiyokotemachi, Takasaki-shi, Gunma, 370-0021						
Renesas	Kawashiri Factory	Japan, 1-1-1, Yahata, Minami-ku, Kumamoto-shi, Kumamoto, 861–4195						
Renesas	Saijo Factory	Japan, 8–6, Hiuchi, Saijo-shi, Ehime, 793-8501						
Renesas – Intersil	Palm Bay	United States, Florida, Palm Bay						
Bosch (formerly TSI Semiconductors) (formerly Renesas)	Roseville fab, M-Line, TD-Line, K-Line	United States, California, Roseville		1992, 1985	200			
TDK – Micronas	FREIBURG	Germany, 19 D-79108, Hans-Bunte-Strasse						
TDK (formerly Renesas)	Tsuruoka Higashi				125			
TDK – Tronics		United States, Texas, Addison						
Silanna (formerly Sapphicon Semiconductor)		Australia, New South Wales, Sydney	0.030	1965,1989	150			
Silanna (formerly Sapphicon Semiconductor) (formerly Peregrine Semiconductor) (formerly Integrated Device Technology)		Australia, New South Wales, Sydney			150	500, 250		RF CMOS, SOS, foundry
Murata Manufacturing	Nagano	Japan	0.100		Murata en France (ex IPDIA)			SAW filters
Murata Manufacturing	Otsuki	Japan						
Murata Manufacturing	Kanazawa	Japan	0.111					SAW filters
Murata Manufacturing (formerly Fujifilm)	Sendai	Japan, Miyagi Prefecture	0.092					MEMS
Murata Manufacturing	Yamanashi	Japan, Yamanashi Prefecture						
Murata Manufacturing	Yasu	Japan, Shiga Prefecture, Yasu						
Murata Electronics (Finland) (formerly VTI, since 1979 Vaisalas int. semicon. line)	Vantaa	Finland		2012, expanded 2019				3D MEMS accelerometers, inclinometers, pressure sensors, gyros, oscillators etc.
Murata Integrated Passive Solutions (formerly NXP then IPDiA)		France, Calvados, Caen						Foundry, Silicon wafers, passive components
Mitsumi Electric	Semiconductor Works #3	Japan, Atsugi Operation Base		2000				
Mitsumi Electric		Japan, Atsugi Operation Base		1979				
Sony	Kagoshima Technology Center	Japan, Kagoshima		1973	100, 125, 150	2000–500	110,000	Bipolar CCD, MOS, MMIC, SXRD
Sony	Oita Technology Center	Japan, Oita		2016				CMOS Image Sensor
Sony	Nagasaki Technology Center	Japan, Nagasaki		1987	150	1000-350	80,000	MOS LSI, CMOS Image Sensors, SXRD
Sony	Kumamoto Technology Center	Japan, Kumamoto		2001				CCD Image Sensors, H-LCD, SXRD
Sony	Shiroishi Zao Technology Center	Japan, Shiroishi		1969				Semiconductor Lasers
Sony	Sony Shiroishi Semiconductor Inc.	Japan, Miyagi						Semiconductor Lasers
Sony (formerly Renesas) (formerly NEC Electronics) (formerly NEC)	Yamagata Technology Center	Japan, Yamagata		2014 (Sony)	100, 125, 150, 200	3000, 2000, 800		MOS, bipolar, CMOS Image Sensor, eDRAM (formerly)
SK Hynix		China, Chongqing						
SK Hynix		China, Chongqing						
SK Hynix		South Korea, Cheongju, Chungcheongbuk-do		Under construction				NAND Flash
SK Hynix		South Korea, Cheongju		Under construction				NAND Flash
SK Hynix	HC1	China, Wuxi			300		100,000	DRAM
SK Hynix	HC2	China, Wuxi			300		70,000	DRAM
SK Hynix	M16	South Korea, Icheon	3.13 (13.4 total planned)	2021	300	10 (EUV)	15,000–20,000 (initial)	DRAM
LG Innotek	Paju	South Korea, 570, Hyuam-ro, Munsan-eup, Paju-si, Gyeonggi-do, 10842						LED Epi-wafer, Chip, Package
ON Semiconductor (formerly GlobalFoundries) (formerly IBM)		United States, New York, East Fishkill	2.5, +.29 (future)	2002	300	90–22, 14	12,000–15,000	Foundry, RF SOI, SOI FinFET (former), SiGe, SiPh
ON Semiconductor (formerly LSI)	Gresham	United States, Oregon, Gresham			200	110		
ON Semiconductor (formerly Fairchild Semiconductor) (formerly National Semiconductor) (formerly Fairchild Semiconductor)		United States, Pennsylvania, Mountain Top		1960–1997	200	350		
ON Semiconductor (formerly TESLA)	Roznov	Czech Republic, Zlín, Rožnov pod Radhoštěm		1956	150, 200	1000	80,000	Si, SiC
ON Semiconductor (formerly Motorola)	ISMF	Malaysia, Seremban			150	350	80,000	Discrete
ON Semiconductor (formerly Fujitsu)	Aizu Wakamatsu Plant	Japan, Fukushima, 3 Kogyo Danchi, Monden-machi, Aizuwakamatsu-shi, 965-8502		1970	150, 200	2000-130		Memory, Logic
JS Foundry K.K. (formerly ON Semiconductor) (formerly Sanyo)	Niigata	Japan, Niigata			125, 150	2000–600, 350	120,000	CMOS, bipolar, BiCMOS
LA Semiconductor (formerly ON Semiconductor) (formerly AMI Semiconductor)	Pocatello	United States, Idaho, Pocatello		1997	200	350		
Diodes Incorporated (formerly ON Semiconductor) (formerly Fairchild Semiconductor) (formerly National Semiconductor) (formerly Fairchild Semiconductor)	SPFAB	United States, Maine, South Portland		1960–1997	200	350		
Diodes Incorporated (formerly Zetex Semiconductors)	OFAB	UK, England, Greater Manchester, Oldham			150			
Diodes Incorporated (formerly BCD Semi)		China			150	4000–1000		
Lite-On Optoelectronics		China, Tianjin						
Lite-On Optoelectronics		Thailand, Bangkok						
Lite-On Optoelectronics		China, Jiangsu						
Lite-On Semiconductor	Keelung Plant	Taiwan, Keelung		1990	100			Thyristor, DIscrete
Lite-On Semiconductor	Hsinchu Plant	Taiwan, Hsinchu		2005				Bipolar BCD, CMOS
Lite-On Semiconductor	Lite-On Semi (Wuxi)	China, Jiangsu		2004	100			Discrete
Lite-On Semiconductor	Wuxi WMEC Plant	China, Jiangsu		2005				Discrete, Power, Optical ICs
Lite-On Semiconductor	Shanghai (SSEC) Plant	China, Shanghai		1993	76			Fab, Assembly
Trumpf (formerly Philips Photonics)		Germany, Baden-Württemberg, Ulm						VCSEL
Philips		Netherlands, North Brabant, Eindhoven			150, 200		30,000	R&D, MEMS
Newport Wafer Fab (formerly Infineon Technologies)	FAB11	UK, Wales, Newport			200	700-180	32,000	Foundry, Compound Semiconductors, IC, MOSFET, IGBT
Nexperia (formerly NXP Semiconductors) (formerly Philips)	Hamburg site	Germany, Hamburg		1953	200		35,000	Small-signal and bipolar discrete devices
Nexperia (formerly NXP Semiconductors) (formerly Philips) (formerly Mullard)	Manchester	UK, England, Greater Manchester, Stockport		1987?	150, 200		24,000	GaN FETs, TrenchMOS MOSFETs
NXP Semiconductors (formerly Philips)	ICN8	Netherlands, Gelderland, Nijmegen			200		40,000+	SiGe
NXP Semiconductors - SSMC	SSMC	Singapore	1.7	2001	200	120	53,000	SiGe
NXP Semiconductors – Jilin Semiconductor		China, Jilin			130			
NXP Semiconductors (formerly Freescale Semiconductor) (formerly Motorola)	Oak Hill Fab	United States, Texas, Austin	0.8	1991	200	250		
NXP Semiconductors (formerly Freescale Semiconductor) (formerly Motorola)	Chandler Fab	United States, Arizona, Chandler	1.1 +0.1 (GaN)	1993	150 (GaN), 200	180		GaN-on-SiC pHEMT
NXP Semiconductors (formerly Freescale Semiconductor) (formerly Motorola)	ATMC	United States, Texas, Austin		1995	200	90		
AWSC		Taiwan, Tainan		1999	150		12,000	Foundry, GaAs HBT, D pHEMT, IPD, ED pHEMT, ED BiHEMT, InGaP
Skyworks Solutions (formerly Conexant) (formerly Rockwell)		United States, California, Newbury Park			100, 150			Compound Semiconductors (GaAs, AlGaAs, InGaP)
Skyworks Solutions (formerly Alpha Industries)		United States, Massachusetts, Woburn			100, 150			RF/cellular components (SiGe, GaAs)
Skyworks Solutions		Japan, Osaka						SAW, TC-SAW Filters
Skyworks Solutions		Japan, Kadoma						SAW, TC-SAW Filters
Skyworks Solutions		Singapore, Bedok South Road						SAW, TC-SAW Filters
Win Semiconductor	Fab A	Taiwan, Taoyuan City			150	2000–10		Foundry, GaAs
Win Semiconductor	Fab B	Taiwan, Taoyuan City			150	2000–10		Foundry, GaAs, GaN
Win Semiconductor	Fab C	Taiwan, Taoyuan	0.050, 0.178	2000, 2009	150			Foundry, GaAs
AMS-Osram	FAB B	Austria, Styria, Unterpremstätten			200	350		Optoelectronics
AMS-Osram (formerly Osram Opto Semiconductors)		Malaysia, Kulim, Kulim Hi-Tech Park	0.350, 1.18	2017, 2020 (second phase, planned)	150			LEDs
AMS-Osram (formerly Osram Opto Semiconductors)		Malaysia, Penang		2009	100			LEDs
AMS-Osram (formerly Osram Opto Semiconductors)		Germany, Bavaria, Regensburg		2003, 2005 (second phase)				LEDs
Winbond	Memory Product Foundry	Taiwan, Taichung			300	46		
Winbond	CTSP Site	Taiwan, No. 8, Keya 1st Rd., Daya Dist., Central Taiwan Science Park, Taichung City 42881			300			
Winbond				Planned	300			
Vanguard International Semiconductor	Fab 1	Taiwan, Hsinchu	0.997	1994	200	500, 350, 250	55,000	Foundry, CMOS
Vanguard International Semiconductor (formerly Winbond)	Fab 2 (formerly Fab 4&5)	Taiwan, Hsinchu	0.965	1998	200		55,000	Foundry
Vanguard International Semiconductor Corporation (formerly GlobalFoundries) (formerly Chartered)	Fab 3E	Singapore	1.3		200	180	34,000	Foundry
TSMC	Fab 2	Taiwan, Hsinchu	0.735	1990	150	800, 600, 500	88,000	Foundry, CMOS
TSMC	Fab 3	Taiwan, Hsinchu	2	1995	200	500, 350, 250	100,000	Foundry, CMOS
TSMC	Fab 5	Taiwan, Hsinchu	1.4	1997	200	350, 250, 180	48,000	Foundry, CMOS
TSMC	Fab 6	Taiwan, Tainan	2.1	2000, January; 2001	200, 300	180–?	99,000	Foundry
TSMC (formerly TASMC) (formerly Acer Semiconductor Manufacturing Inc.) (formerly Texas Instruments)	Fab 7	Taiwan			200	350, 250, 220, 180	33,000	Foundry (current) DRAM (former), Logic (former)
TSMC (formerly WSMC)	Fab 8	Taiwan, Hsinchu	1.6	1998	200	250, 180	85,000	Foundry
TSMC (formerly WSMC)				2000	200	250, 150	30,000	Foundry
TSMC China Company	Fab 10	China, Shanghai	1.3	2004	200		74,000	Foundry
TSMC	Fab 12	Taiwan, Hsinchu	5.2, 21.6 (total, all phases combined)	2001	300	150–28	77,500–123,800 (all phases combined)	Foundry
TSMC	Fab 12 (P4)	Taiwan, Hsinchu	6	2009	300	20	40,000	Foundry
TSMC	Fab 12 (P5)	Taiwan, Hsinchu	3.6	2011	300	20	6,800	Foundry
TSMC	Fab 12 (P6)	Taiwan, Hsinchu	4.2	2013	300	16	25,000	Foundry
TSMC	Fab 14	Taiwan, Tainan	5.1	2002, 2004	300	20	82,500	Foundry
TSMC	Fab 14 (B)	Taiwan, Tainan			300	16	50,000+	Foundry
TSMC	Fab 14 (P3)	Taiwan, Tainan	3.1	2008	300	16	55,000	Foundry
TSMC	Fab 14 (P4)	Taiwan, Tainan	3.750	2011	300	16	45,500	Foundry
TSMC	Fab 14 (P5)	Taiwan, Tainan	3.650	2013	300	16		Foundry
TSMC	Fab 14 (P6)	Taiwan, Tainan	4.2	2014	300	16		Foundry
TSMC	Fab 14 (P7)	Taiwan, Tainan	4.850	2015	300	16		Foundry
TSMC	Fab 15	Taiwan, Taichung	9.3	2011	300	20	100,000+(166,000 estimate)	Foundry
TSMC	Fab 15 (P1)	Taiwan, Taichung	3.125	2011	300		4,000	Foundry
TSMC	Fab 15 (P2)	Taiwan, Taichung	3.150	2012	300			Foundry
TSMC	Fab 15 (P3)	Taiwan, Taichung	3.750	2013	300			Foundry
TSMC	Fab 15 (P4)	Taiwan, Taichung	3.800	2014	300			Foundry
TSMC	Fab 15 (P5)	Taiwan, Taichung	9.020	2016	300		35,000	Foundry
TSMC	Fab 18 (P1-P3)	Taiwan, Southern Taiwan Science Park	17.08	2020 (P7 under construction)	300	5	120,000	Foundry
TSMC	Fab 18 (P4-P6)	Taiwan, Southern Taiwan Science Park		2022 (planned), under construction	300	3	120,000	Foundry
TSMC	Fab 21 (P1)	United States, Arizona, Phoenix	12	Q4 2024	300	5 & 4	20,000	Foundry
TSMC	Fab 21 (P2)	United States, Arizona, Phoenix	65 (shared for Fab 21 site)	2H 2027 (planned), under construction		3		Foundry
TSMC	Fab 21 (P3)	United States, Arizona, Phoenix	65 (shared for Fab 21 site)	2029-2030 (planned), under construction		1.6 & 2		Foundry
Epistar	Fab F1	Taiwan, Longtan Science Park						LEDs
Epistar	Fab A1	Taiwan, Hsinchu Science Park						LEDs
Epistar	Fab N2	Taiwan, Hsinchu Science Park						LEDs
Epistar	Fab N8	Taiwan, Hsinchu Science Park						LEDs
Epistar	Fab N1	Taiwan, Hsinchu Science Park						LEDs
Epistar	Fab N3	Taiwan, Hsinchu Science Park						LEDs
Epistar	Fab N6	Taiwan, Chunan Science Park						LEDs
Epistar	Fab N9	Taiwan, Chunan Science Park						LEDs
Epistar	Fab H1	Taiwan, Central Taiwan Science Park						LEDs
Epistar	Fab S1	Taiwan, Tainan Science Park						LEDs
Epistar	Fab S3	Taiwan, Tainan Science Park						LEDs
Epistar (formerly TSMC)		Taiwan, Hsin-Chu Science Park	0.080	2011, second half				LEDs
GCS		United States, California, Torrance		1999	100		6,400	Foundry, GaAs, InGaAs, InGaP, InP, HBT, PICs
Bosch		Germany, Baden-Württemberg, Reutlingen		1995	150			ASIC, analog, power, SiC
Bosch		Germany, Saxony, Dresden	1.0	2021	300	65		
Bosch	WaferFab	Germany, Baden-Württemberg, Reutlingen	0.708	2010	200		30,000	ASIC, analog, power, MEMS
STMicroelectronics	AMK8 (second, newer fab)	Singapore, Ang Mo Kio		1995	200			
STMicroelectronics (formerly SGS Microelettronica)	AMJ9 (first fab)	Singapore, Ang Mo Kio		1984	150, 200		6" 14 kpcs/day, 8" 1.4 kpcs/day	Power-MOS/ IGBT/ bipolar/ CMOS
X-Fab	Erfurt	Germany, Thuringia, Erfurt		1985	200	1000-600	11200–	Foundry, InP
X-Fab (formerly ZMD)	Dresden	Germany, Saxony, Dresden	0.095	1985	200	1000-350	6000–	Foundry, CMOS, GaN-on-Si
X-Fab (formerly MEMS Foundry Itzehoe)	Itzehoe	Germany, Schleswig-Holstein, Itzehoe			200		13000–	Foundry, MEMS
X-Fab (formerly 1st Silicon)	Kuching	Malaysia, Kuching	1.89	2000	200	350-130	30,000–	Foundry
X-Fab (formerly Texas Instruments)	Lubbock	United States, Texas, Lubbock	0.197	1977	150, 200	1000-600	15000–	Foundry, SiC
X-Fab France SAS (formerly Altis Semiconductor) (formerly IBM)	ACL-AMF	France, Île-de-France, Corbeil-Essonnes		1991, 1964	200	350-110		Foundry, CMOS, RF SOI
IXYS		Germany, Hesse, Lampertheim						IGBT
IXYS		UK, England, Wiltshire, Chippenham						
IXYS		United States, Massachusetts						
IXYS		United States, California						
Samsung	V1-Line	South Korea, Hwaseong	6	2020, February 20	300	7		Foundry
Samsung	S5-Line	South Korea, Pyeongtaek			300			Foundry
Samsung	S4-Line	South Korea, Hwaseong			300			Foundry
Samsung	S3-Line	South Korea, Hwaseong	10.2, 16.2 (planned)	2017	300	10	200,000	Foundry
Samsung	S1-Line	South Korea, Giheung	33 (total)	2005 (second phase), 1983 (first phase)	300	65–7	62,000	Foundry, CMOS, FDSOI
Samsung	Line-6	South Korea, Giheung			100, 150, 200	1500–500, 180–65		Foundry, CMOS, BiCMOS
Samsung	S6-Line	United States, Texas, Taylor			300			Foundry
Samsung	S2-Line	United States, Texas, Austin	16	2011	300	65–11	92,000	Foundry, CMOS, FDSOI
Samsung	Pyeongtaek	South Korea, Pyeongtaek	14.7, 27 (total)	2017, July 6	300	14	450,000	V-NAND, DRAM
Samsung	Samsung China Semiconductor	China, Shaanxi Province						DDR Memory
Samsung	F1x1	China, Xian	2.3	2014 (first phase, second phase is under review)	300	20	100,000	VNAND
Samsung	Giheung Campus	South Korea, Gyeonggi-do, Yongin						LEDs
Samsung	Hwasung Campus	South Korea, Gyeonggi-do, Hwaseong						LEDs
Samsung	Tianjin Samsung LED Co., Ltd.	China, Tianjin, Xiqing						LEDs
Seagate		United States, Minnesota, Minneapolis						Read/write heads,
Seagate		UK, Northern Ireland						Read/write heads
Broadcom Inc. (formerly Avago)		United States, Colorado, Fort Collins						
Wolfspeed (formerly Cree Inc.)	Durham	United States, North Carolina, Durham						Compound Semiconductors, LEDs
Wolfspeed (formerly Cree Inc.)	Research Triangle Park	United States, North Carolina						GaN HEMT RF ICs
SMART Modular Technologies		Brazil, São Paulo, Atibaia		2006				Packaging
Infineon Technologies	Villach	Austria, Carinthia, Villach		1970	100, 150, 200, 300			MEMS, SiC, GaN
Infineon Technologies	Dresden	Germany, Saxony, Dresden	3	1994–2011	200, 300	90		
Infineon Technologies	Kulim	Malaysia, Kulim Hi-Tech Park		2006	200, 300		50,000	Power Semiconductor, GaN, SiC
Infineon Technologies	Kulim 2	Malaysia, Kulim Hi-Tech Park		2015	200, 300		50,000	Power Semiconductor, GaN, SiC
Infineon Technologies	Kulim 3	Malaysia, Kulim Hi-Tech Park	8	2025	200			Power Semiconductor, GaN, SiC
Infineon Technologies	Regensburg	Germany, Bavaria, Regensburg		1959				
Infineon Technologies	Cegled	Hungary, Pest, Cegléd						
Infineon Technologies (formerly Cypress Semiconductor) (formerly Spansion) (formerly AMD)	Fab 25	United States, Texas, Austin	1.5	1995	200			
D-Wave Systems	Superconducting Foundry							Quantum Processing Units (QPUs)
GlobalFoundries (formerly AMD)	Fab 1 Module 1	Germany, Saxony, Dresden	3.6	2005	300	45-22	35,000	Foundry, SOI, FDSOI
GlobalFoundries (formerly AMD)	Fab 1 Module 2	Germany, Saxony, Dresden	4.9	1999	300	45-22	25,000	Foundry, SOI
GlobalFoundries	Fab 1 Module 3	Germany, Saxony, Dresden	2.3	2011	300	45-22	6,000	Foundry, SOI
GlobalFoundries (formerly Chartered)	Fab 2	Singapore	1.3	1995	200	600-350	56,000	Foundry, SOI
GlobalFoundries (formerly Chartered)	Fab 3/5	Singapore	0.915, 1.2	1997, 1995	200	350-180	54,000	Foundry, SOI
GlobalFoundries (formerly Chartered)	Fab 6 (merged into Fab 7)	Singapore	1.4	2000	200, 300 (merged)	180-110	45,000	Foundry, SOI
GlobalFoundries (formerly Chartered)	Fab 7	Singapore	4.6	2005	300	130, 110, 90, 65, 40	50,000	Foundry, Bulk CMOS, RF SOI
GlobalFoundries	Fab 8	United States, New York, Malta	4.6, 2.1, (1, future) 13+ (total)	2012, 2014	300	28, 22, 14, 12	60,000 (+12,500 future)	Foundry, High-K Metal Gate, SOI FinFET
GlobalFoundries (formerly IBM)	Fab 9	United States, Vermont, Essex Junction		1957	200	350-90	50,000	Foundry, SiGe, RF SOI, GaN
GlobalFoundries	Technology Development Center	United States, New York, Malta	1.5	2014				
SUNY Poly CNSE	NanoFab 300 North	United States, New York, Albany	0.175, 0.050	2004, 2005	300	65, 45, 32, 22		
SUNY Poly CNSE	NanoFab 200	United States, New York, Albany	0.016	1997	200			
SUNY Poly CNSE	NanoFab Central	United States, New York, Albany	0.150	2009	300	22		
Skorpios Technologies (formerly Novati) (formerly ATDF) (formerly SEMATECH)		United States, Texas, Austin	0.065	1989	200		10,000	MEMS, photonics, foundry
Opto Diode		United States, California, Camarillo						LED, Photodiode, PbS/PbSe Infrared Detectors
Optek Technology				1968	100, 150			GaAs, LEDs
II-VI (formerly Oclaro) (formerly Bookham) (formerly NORTHERN TELECOM SEMICONDUCTOR NORTHERN TELECOM EUROPE) (formerly JDS Uniphase) (formerly Uniphase)								Semiconductor Lasers, Photodiodes
Infinera		United States, California, Sunnyvale						
Rogue Valley Microdevices		United States, Oregon, Medford		2003	50.8–300			MEMS Foundry, Thin Films Foundry, Silicon Wafers, Wafer Services, MEMS R&D
Atomica	Fab 1	United States, California, Goleta		2000	150, 200	350	20,000	Foundry: MEMS, Photonics, Sensors, Biochips
Sensera	uDev-1	United States, Massachusetts, Woburn		2014	150	700	1,000	MEMS, MicroDevice assembly
Rigetti Computing	Fab-1	United States, California, Fremont			130			Quantum Processors
Polar Semiconductor	FAB 1,2,3	United States, Minnesota, Bloomington			200			BCD, HV, GMR
Orbit Semiconductor					100			CCD, CMOS
Entrepix		United States, Arizona, Tempe		2003				
Technologies and Devices International		United States, Florida, Silver Springs		2002				
Soraa Inc		United States, California						
Soraa Laser Diode								
Mirrorcle Technologies		United States, California, Richmond						
Unitec do Brasil		Brazil, Minas Gerais, Ribeirão das Neves		Planned				
Unitec Blue		Argentina, Buenos Aires Province, Chascomús	0.3 (1.2 planned)	2013				RFID, SIM, EMV
Everlight	Yuan-Li Plant	Taiwan, Miao-Li						LEDs
Everlight	Pan-Yu Plant	China						LEDs
Everlight	Tu-Cheng Plant	Taiwan, Taipei Country						LEDs
Optotech		Taiwan, Hsinchu						LEDs
Arima Optoelectronics		Taiwan, Hsinchu		1999				
Episil Semiconductor		Taiwan, Hsinchu		1992, 1990, 1988				
Episil Semiconductor		Taiwan, Hsinchu		1992, 1990, 1988				
Creative Sensor Inc.	NanChang Creative Sensor	China, Jiangxi		2007				Image Sensors
Creative Sensor Inc.	Wuxi Creative Sensor	China, Jiangsu		2002				
Creative Sensor Inc.	Wuxi Creative Sensor	Taiwan, Taipei City		1998				
Visera Technologies	Headquarters Phase I	Taiwan, Hsinchu Science-based Industrial Park		2007, September				CMOS Image Sensors
Panjit		Taiwan, Kaohsiung	0.1	2003				
Nanosystem Fabrication Facility		Hong Kong						
GTA Semiconductor (formerly ASMC)	Fab 2, Fab 3	China, Shanghai, Xuhui District			200	350, 180, 150	55333	HV Analog, Power
GTA Semiconductor	Fab 5, Fab 6	China, Shanghai, Pudong New Area	5.1	2020	150, 200, 300		115000	
Shanghai Belling		China, Shanghai			150	1200		BiCMOS, CMOS
SiSemi		China, Shenzhen, Longgang High-tech Industrial Park		2004	130			Power semiconductors, LED drivers, bipolar power transistors, power MOSFETs
SiSemi				1997	100			Transistors
CRMicro (formerly CSMC)	Fab 1			1998	150		60,000	HV Analog, MEMS, Power, Analog, Foundry
CRMicro (formerly CSMC)	Fab 2	China, Wuxi		2008	200	180, 130	40,000	HV Analog, Foundry
CRMicro (formerly CSMC)	Fab 3			1995	200	130	20,000	
CRMicro (formerly CSMC)	Fab 5			2005			30,000	
Nexchip	N1	China, Hefei		Q4 2017	300	150-40	40,000	Display Drivers IC
Nexchip	N2	China, Hefei		Under construction	300		40,000	
Nexchip	N3	China, Hefei		Under construction	300		40,000	
Nexchip	N4	China, Hefei		Under construction	300		40,000	
Wandai	CQ	China, Chongqing		Under construction	300		20,000	
San'an Optoelectronics	Tianjin San'an Optoelectronics Co., Ltd.	China, Tianjin						LEDs
San'an Optoelectronics	Xiamen San'an Optoelectronics Technology Co., Ltd.	China, Xiamen						LEDs
San'an Optoelectronics	Xiamen San'an Optoelectronics Co., Ltd.	China, Xiamen						LEDs
San'an Optoelectronics	Wuhu Anrui Optoelectronics Co., Ltd.	China, Wuhu						LEDs
San'an Optoelectronics	Anrui San'an Optoelectronics Co., Ltd.	China, Wuhu						LEDs
San'an Optoelectronics	Quanzhou San'an Semiconductor Technology Co., Ltd.	China, Nan'an						LEDs
Sanan IC	Xiamen Fab	China, Xiamen	0.00785	2014	150		30,000	SAW filters, Foundry, GaA, GaN, RF, Power
Sanan IC	Quanzhou Fab	China, Quanzhou	4.6	2017	150		8,000	SAW filters, Foundry, GaA, RF
Sanan IC	Changsha Fab	China, Changsha	2.3	2021	150		30,000	Foundry, GaN, SiC, Power
Hua Hong Semiconductor	HH Fab7	China, Wuxi			300	90-55	95,000	Foundry, eNVM, RF, Mixed Signal, Logic, Power Management, Power Discrete
Hua Hong Semiconductor	HH Fab1	China, Shanghai, Jinqiao			200	95	65,000	Foundry, eNVM, RF, Mixed Signal, Logic, Power Management, Power Discrete
Hua Hong Semiconductor	HH Fab2	China, Shanghai, Zhangjiang			200	180	60,000	Foundry, eNVM, RF, Mixed Signal, Logic, Power Management, Power Discrete
Hua Hong Semiconductor	HH Fab3	China, Shanghai, Zhangjiang			200	90	53,000	Foundry, eNVM, RF, Mixed Signal, Logic, Power Management, Power Discrete
Hua Hong Semiconductor (HLMC)	HH Fab5	China, Shanghai, Zhangjiang		2011	300	65/55-40	35,000	Foundry
Hua Hong Semiconductor (HLMC)	HH Fab6	China, Shanghai, Kangqiao		2018	300	28/22	40,000	Foundry
HuaLei Optoelectronic		China						LEDs
Sino King Technology		China, Hefei		2017				DRAM
APT Electronics		China, Guangzhou		2006				
Aqualite		China, Guangzhou		2006				
Aqualite		China, Wuhan		2008				
Xiamen Jaysun Semiconductor Manufacturing	Fab 101	China, Xiamen	0.035	2011				
Xiyue Electronics Technology	Fab 1	China, Xian	0.096	2007				
Hanking Electronics	Fab 1	China, Fushun		2018	200		10,000 – 30,000	MEMS Foundry, MEMS Design MEMS Sensors (Inertial, Pressure, Ultrasound, Piezoelectric, LiDar, Bolometer ) IoT Motion Sensors
CanSemi	Phase I	China, Guangzhou	4	2019	300	180–90	20,000	Power, Analog, Power Discrete
CanSemi	Phase II	China, Guangzhou		2022	300	90-55	20,000	
CanSemi	Phase III	China, Guangzhou	2.4	Planned	300	55-40	40,000	Automotive, IoT
SensFab		Singapore		1995				
MIMOS		Malaysia, Kuala Lumpur	0.006, 0.135	1997, 2002				R&D
Silterra Malaysia	Fab1	Malaysia, Kedah, Kulim	1.6	2000	200	250, 200, 180–90	46,000	CMOS, HV, MEMS, RF, Logic, Analog, Mix Signal
Pyongyang Semiconductor Factory	111 Factory	North Korea, Pyongyang		1980s		3000		
DB HiTek	Fab 1	South Korea, Bucheon		1997				Foundry
DB HiTek	Fab 2	South Korea, Eumsung-Kun		2001				Foundry
DB HiTek	Fab 2 Module 2	South Korea, Eumsung-Kun						Foundry
Kodenshi AUK Group	Silicon FAB Line							
Kodenshi AUK Group	Compound FAB Line							
Kyocera								SAW devices
Seiko Instruments		China, Shanghai						
Seiko Instruments		Japan, Akita						
Seiko Instruments		Japan, Takatsuka						
Epson	T wing	Japan, Sakata		1997	200	350-150	25,000	
Epson	S wing	Japan, Sakata		1991	150	1200-350	20,000	
Olympus Corporation	Nagano	Japan, Nagano Prefecture						MEMS
Olympus		Japan						MEMS
New Japan Radio	Kawagoe Works	Japan, Saitama Prefecture, Fujimino City		1959	100, 150	4000, 400, 350		Bipolar, Mixed Signal, Analog, Hi Speed BiCMOS, BCD, 40V Hi Speed Complementary Bipolar, Analog CMOS+HV, SAW Filters
New Japan Radio	Saga Electronics	Japan, Saga Prefecture			100, 150	4000, 400, 350		Foundry, Bipolar, Mixed Signal, Analog, Hi Speed BiCMOS, BCD, 40V Hi Speed Complementary Bipolar, Analog CMOS+HV, SAW Filters
New Japan Radio	NJR FUKUOKA	Japan, Fukuoka Prefecture, Fukuoka City		2003	100, 150			Bipolar, Analog ICs, MOSFETs LSI, BiCMOS ICs
New Japan Radio		Japan, Nagano, Nagano City						
New Japan Radio		Japan, Nagano, Ueda City						
Nichia	YOKOHAMA TECHNOLOGY CENTER	Japan, Kanagawa						LEDs
Nichia	SUWA TECHNOLOGY CENTER	Japan, Nagano						LEDs
Taiyo Yuden		Japan, Nagano						SAW devices
Taiyo Yuden		Japan, Ome						SAW devices
Silex Microsystems		Sweden, Stockholm County, Järfälla	0.009, 0.032	2003, 2009				
Elmos Semiconductor		Germany, North Rhine-Westphalia, Dortmund		1984	200	800, 350	9000	HV-CMOS
United Monolithic Semiconductors		Germany, Baden-Württemberg, Ulm			100	700, 250, 150, 100		Foundry, FEOL, MMIC, GaAs pHEMT, InGaP, GaN HEMT, MESFET, Schottky diode
United Monolithic Semiconductors		France, Île-de-France, Villebon-sur-Yvette			100			Foundry, BEOL
Innovative Ion Implant		France, Provence-Alpes-Côte d'Azur, Peynier			51–300			
Innovative Ion Implant		UK, Scotland, Bathgate			51–300			
nanoPHAB		Netherlands, North Brabant, Eindhoven			50–100	50-10	2–10	MEMS
Micron Semiconductor Ltd.	Lancing	UK, England, West Sussex, Lancing						Detectors
Pragmatic Semiconductor	FlexLogic 001	UK, England, Durham	0.020	2018	200	600	4,000	Flexible Semiconductor / Foundry and IDM
Pragmatic Semiconductor	FlexLogic 002	UK, England, Durham	0.050	2023	300	600	15,000	Flexible Semiconductor / Foundry and IDM
Pragmatic Semiconductor	FlexLogic 003	UK, England, Durham	0.050	Planned 2025 on line	300	600	15,000	Flexible Semiconductor / Foundry and IDM
INEX Microtechnology		UK, England, Northumberland, Newcastle upon Tyne		2014	150			Foundry
CSTG		UK, Scotland, Glasgow		2003	76, 100			InP, GaAs, AlAs, AlAsSb, GaSb, GaN, InGaN, AlN, diodes, LEDs, lasers, PICs, Optical amplifiers, Foundry
Photonix		UK, Scotland, Glasgow	0.011	2000				
Integral		Belarus, Minsk		1963	100, 150, 200	2000, 1500, 350		
VSP Mikron	WaferFab	Russia, Voronezh Oblast, Voronezh		1959	100, 150	900+	6,000	Bipolar, Power Semiconductors
Vishay Intertechnology	Newport Wafer Fab	UK, Wales, Newport	0.17	1982	200		30,000	Power Semiconductors, MOSFETs, Diodes, Automotive
Semikron	Nbg Fab	Germany, Nuremberg		1984	150	3500	70,000	Bipolar, Power Semiconductors
NM-Tech		Russia, Moscow, Zelenograd		2016	200	250-110	20,000	
Angstrem	Liniya 100	Russia, Moscow, Zelenograd		1963	100	1200	500 (6,000 per year)	
Angstrem	Liniya 150	Russia, Moscow, Zelenograd		1963	150	600	6,000 (72,000 per year)	
Mikron Group	Mikron	Russia, Moscow, Zelenograd	0.4	2012	200; 150; 100	250-65; 2000-1600	3,000; 8,000; 5,000	
Crocus Nano Electronics		Russia, Moscow	0.2	2016	300	90-55	4,000	BEOL
NIIIS		Russia, Nizhny Novgorod Oblast, Nizhny Novgorod		2010	100–150	350-150		MEMS
NPP Istok		Russia, Moscow Oblast, Fryazino			150			
Micran		Russia, Tomsk Oblast, Tomsk		2015	100			
Kremny EL		Russia, Bryansk Oblast, Bryansk		2019		500		
Syntez Microelectronics		Russia, Voronezh Oblast, Voronezh		1992	200	350-65		SiC, GaN, TSV
NZPP Vostok		Russia, Novosibirsk Oblast, Novosibirsk		1956	100	250-180		
Russian Space Systems		Russia, Moscow			76, 100, 150	1000		
Ruselectronics	Svetlana-Rost	Russia, Saint Petersburg			50, 76, 100	1000, 800, 500, 200		
OKB-Planeta	Svetlana-Rost	Russia, Novgorod Oblast, Veliky Novgorod			100	150		
FBK – Fondazione Bruno Kessler	MNF	Italy, Trento		1990	150	500		Research Institute; prototype productions of silicon MEMS, silicon radiation sensors
CEITEC – Centro Nacional de Tecnologia Electrônica Avançada S.A		Brazil, Porto Alegre		2008		600		Research Institute; prototype production
HT Micron (Hana Micron)	São Leopoldo	Brazil, São Leopoldo	0.2	2009				DRAM, MCP, NAND Flash
Honeywell Aerospace Technologies		United States, Redmond, Washington						MEMS
Microchip (formerly Fujitsu Microelectronics)	Fab 4	United States, Oregon, Gresham	0.1835		200	110	30,000	
Microchip (formerly Atmel)	Fab 5	United States, Colorado, Colorado Springs			150	250	40,000	Domestic rad-hard MOSFET, silicon carbide, cryptography, hi-rel discretes, MEMS, automotive, analog, microcontrollers, and memory
Microchip (part of Microsemi acquisition, formerly New England Semiconductor)	Lawrence	United States, Massachusetts, Lawrence			76.2 and 100	1,000	2,000	
Applied Optoelectronics	FAB1	United States, Texas, Sugar Land		2000	150			optoelectronics
Applied Optoelectronics	FAB2	United States, Texas, Sugar Land		2026				optoelectronics

Number of open fabs currently listed here: 478

(NOTE: Some fabs located in Asia don't use the number 4, or any 2 digit number that adds up to 4, because it is considered bad luck; see tetraphobia.)

== Closed plants ==
Company	Plant Name	Plant Location	Plant Cost (in US$ Billions)	Started Production	Wafer Size (mm)	Process Technology Node (nm)	Production Capacity (Wafers/Month)	Technology / Products	Ended Production
Thema Foundries (formerly BelGaN Group) (formerly ON Semiconductor) (formerly AMI Semiconductor) (formerly Alcatel Microelectronics) (formerly Mietec)	Oudenaarde	Belgium, East Flanders, Oudenaarde			150, 200	3000, 2000–350		GaN, mixed-signal CMOS, BCD foundry	2024
VEF		Soviet Union, Latvia, Riga		1960				Semi-secret government semiconductor fab and a major research center separated from the Russian military manufacturing complex by the collapse of the USSR.	1999
Tower Semiconductor (formerly Micron)	Fab 4	Japan, Hyōgo, Nishiwaki	0.450	1992	200	95	60,000	DRAM, foundry	2014
Tower Semiconductor – Tacoma		China, Jiangsu, Nanjing		halted, bankruptcy in June 2020	200, 300 (planned)			Foundry	2020
Fujian Jinhua (JHICC)	F2	China, Fujian, Jinjiang	5.65	2018 (planned)	300	22	60,000	DRAM	2018
Decoma	F2	China, Jiangsu, Huai'an		Under construction	300		20,000		2020
Wuhan Hongxin Semiconductor Manufacturing (HSMC)		China, Hubei, Wuhan		2019 (halted)	300	14, 7	30,000	Foundry	2020
Tsinghua Unigroup – Unigroup Guoxin (Unigroup, Xi'an UniIC Semiconductors Co., Ltd.)	SZ	China, Guangdong, Shenzhen	12.5	Planned	300		50,000	DRAM	2019 (just plan)
TSMC	Fab 1	Taiwan; Hsinchu, Baoshan		1987	150	2000-800	20,000	Foundry, CMOS, BiCMOS	2001, March 9
UMC	Fab 1	Japan, Chiba, Tateyama	0.543	1997	200		40,000	Foundry	2012
SK Hynix	E-4	United States, Oregon, Eugene	1.3	2007	200		30,000	DRAM	2008
Symetrix – Panasonic		Brazil	0.9 (planned)	planned				FeRAM	(just plan)
Rohm (formerly Data General)		United States, California, Sunnyvale							
Kioxia	Fab 1 (at Yokkaichi Operations)	Japan, Mie, Yokkaichi		1992	200	400	35,000	SRAM, DRAM	2001, September
NEC	Livingston	United Kingdom, Scotland, West Lothian, Livingston	4.5 (total)	1981	150, 200	800–350, 250, 180	30,000	CMOS, DRAM, SRAM, MCUs, ASICs, DSPs	2001, April
LFoundry (formerly Renesas Electronics)		Germany, Bavaria, Landshut		1992	200				2011
LFoundry (formerly Atmel)		France, Bouches-du-Rhône, Rousset		?	200		25.000		
Atmel (formerly Siemens)	Fab 9	United Kingdom, Tyne and Wear, North Tyneside	1.53	1998				DRAM	2007
EI Niš	Ei Poluprovodnici	Serbia, Nišava, Niš		1962	100				2000
Plessey Semiconductors (formerly Plus Semi) (formerly MHS Electronics) (formerly Zarlink) (formerly Mitel) (formerly Plessey Semiconductors)		UK, Devon, Plymouth			100, 150	800, 500	8,000	Bipolar, ASICs, linear ICs	
Telefunken Semiconductors	Heilbronn, HNO-Line	Germany, Baden-Württemberg, Heilbronn	0.125	1993	100, 150	800	10,000	Bipolar, CMOS, BiCMOS, GaAs, SiGe, ASICs, ASSPs, MCUs, discrete, optoelectronics	2015
Qimonda	Richmond	United States, Virginia, Richmond	3	2005	300	65	38,000	DRAM	2009, January
STMicroelectronics (formerly Nortel)		United States, California, San Diego, Rancho Bernardo			100, 150	800, 500		NMOS, CMOS, BiCMOS	2002
Freescale Semiconductor (formerly Motorola)	Toulouse Fab	France, Haute-Garonne, Toulouse		1969	150	650		Automotive	2012
Freescale Semiconductor (formerly Motorola) (formerly Tohoku Semiconductor)	Sendai Fab	Japan, Miyagi, Sendai		1987	150, 200	500		DRAM, microcontrollers, analog, sensors	2009?
Agere Systems (formerly Lucent) (formerly AT&T)		Spain, Madrid, Tres Cantos	0.67	1987		500, 350, 300		CMOS	2001
GMT Microelectronics (formerly Commodore Semiconductor) (formerly MOS Technology)		United States, Pennsylvania, Audubon		1969; 1976; 1995		1000			1976; 1992; 2001
Integrated Device Technology		United States, California, Salinas		1985	150	800-350			2002
ON Semiconductor (formerly Cherry Semiconductor)		United States, Rhode Island, East Greenwich			100, 150	1400	10,000	Bipolar, BiCMOS, Linear ICs and ASICs	2004
ON Semiconductor (formerly Motorola)		United States, Arizona, Phoenix			150	5000-500	12,000	MOS, power discrete	2011
ON Semiconductor (formerly Motorola)	Aizu Plant	Japan, Aizu			100, 150	1200, 1000	40,000	CMOS, MCUs, logic and smart power ICs	2012
ON Semiconductor (formerly Truesense Imaging, Kodak)	Rochester	United States, New York, Rochester			150			CCDs and Image Sensors	2020
Intel	Fab 8	Israel, Jerusalem District, Jerusalem		1985	150			Microprocessors, Chipsets, Microcontrollers	2007
Intel	Fab D2	United States, California, Santa Clara		1989	200	130	8,000	Microprocessors, Chipsets, Flash memory	2009
Intel	Fab 17	United States, Massachusetts, Hudson		1998	200	130		Chipsets and other	2014
Fairchild Semiconductor (formerly National Semiconductor)	West Jordan	United States, Utah, West Jordan		1977	150				2015
Texas Instruments	HFAB	United States, Texas, Houston		1967	150				2013
Texas Instruments (formerly Silicon Systems)	Santa Cruz	United States, California, Santa Cruz	0.250	1980	150	800	80,000	HDD	2001
Texas Instruments (formerly National Semiconductor)	Arlington	United States, Texas, Arlington		1985	150	80000, 35000			2010
Unknown (fortune 500 company)		United States, East Coast			150		1,600	MEMS	2016
Diodes Incorporated (formerly Lite-On Power Semiconductor) (formerly AT&T)	KFAB	United States, Missouri, Lee's Summit		1994	130				2017
Qorvo (formerly TriQuint Semiconductor) (formerly Sawtek)		United States, Florida, Apopka						SAW filters	2019
GlobalFoundries	Abu Dhabi	UAE, Emirate of Abu Dhabi, Abu Dhabi	6.8 (planned)	2016 (planned)	300	180-110	45,000	Foundry	2011 (plan stopped)
GlobalFoundries – Chengdu		China, Sichuan, Chengdu	10 (planned)	2018 (planned), 2019 (second phase)	300	180/130 (cancelled), 22 (second phase)	20,000 (85,000 planned)	Foundry, FDSOI (second phase)	2020 (was idle)
Tondi Elektroonika	A-1381	Soviet Union, Estonia, Harju, Tallinn		1958				Radio equipment, Transisors, Photodiode	1978
Intersil (formerly Harris Semiconductor, formerly GE, formerly RCA)		United States, Ohio, Findlay		1954	100, 125	2000, 1500, 1200	60,000	CMOS, bipolar, BiCMOS, Semiconductors, Optoelectronics, Integrated Circuits, Research	2003
Microchip (formerly General Instrument)	Fab 1	United States, Arizona, Chandler			125		5,000		
Microchip (formerly Digital Equipment Corporation, formerly GTE Corporation)	Fab 2	United States, Arizona, Tempe			200	250	20,000		
Microchip (formerly Matsushita Semiconductor Corporation of America)	Fab 3	United States, Washington, Puyallup						field-programmable microcontrollers, serial EEPROMs, and microperipheral products	

Number of closed fabs currently listed here: 49

== See also ==
- List of MEMS foundries
- List of Intel manufacturing sites
- List of integrated circuit manufacturers
- List of semiconductor companies by country
- Semiconductor device fabrication
