= Lumileds =

Dutch lighting company

Lumileds Holding B.V.
- Company type: Private
- Industry: Semiconductor
- Founded: 1999
- Headquarters: Schiphol, Haarlemmermeer, The Netherlands
- Key people: Steve Barlow (CEO); Oleg Shchekin (CTO); Tom Constantino (CFO)
- Products: LEDs, Lighting, Automotive Lighting
- Number of employees: ~3500 (2026)
- Website: www.lumileds.com

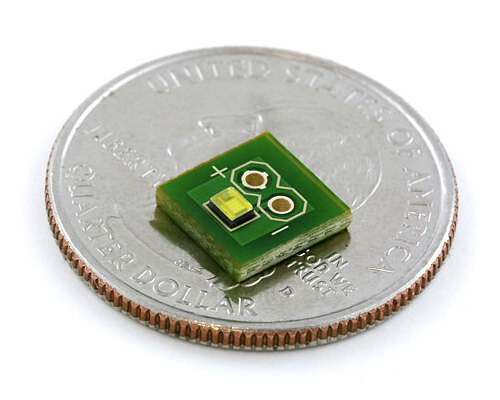
A white Luxeon Portable LED from Lumileds

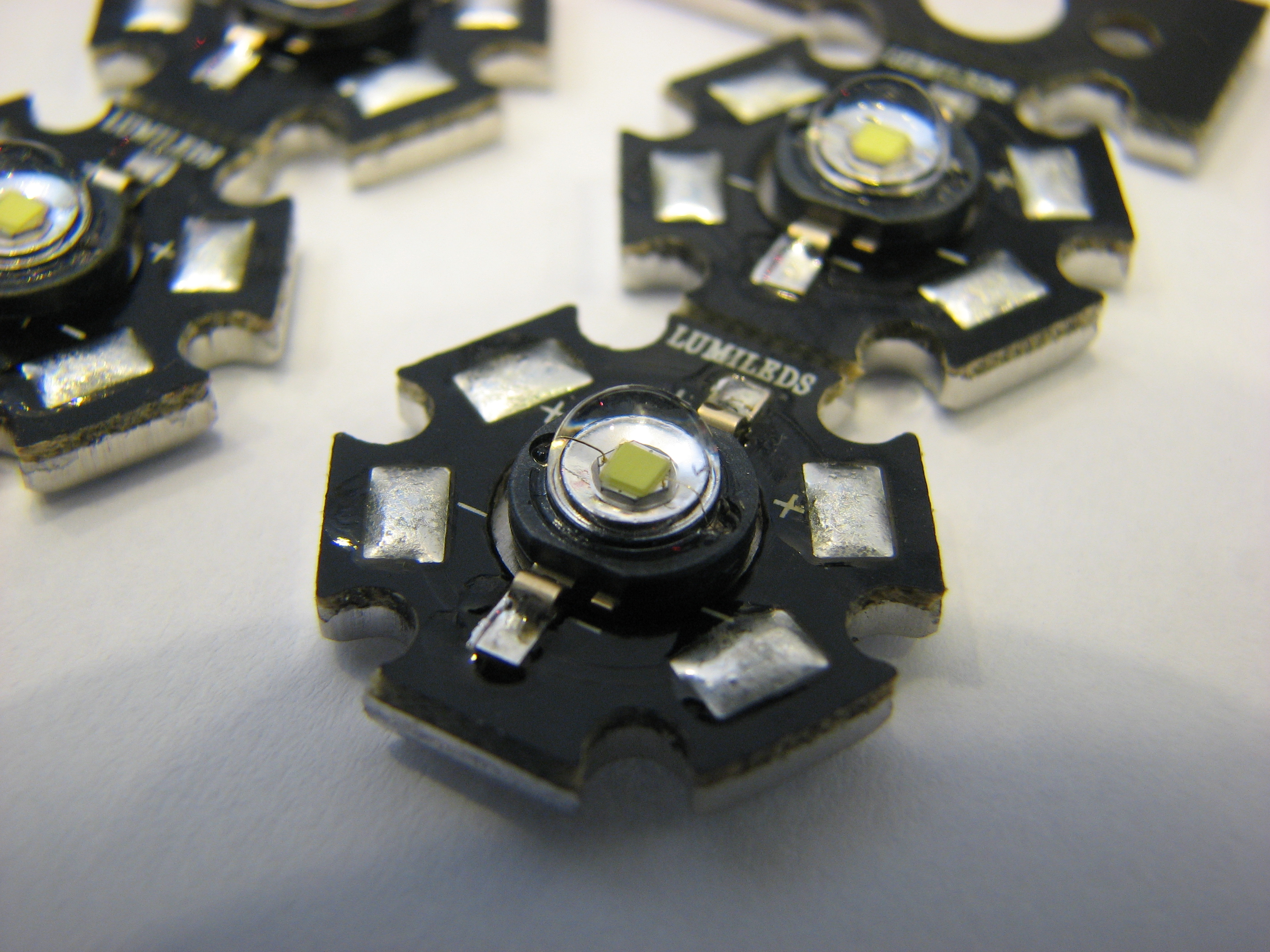
Luxeon white LEDs on a IMS PCB

Lumileds is a private lighting company that develops, manufactures, and distributes LEDs and related products for automotive lighting, general lighting, and specialty lighting. As of 2025, Lumileds is the 7th largest global LED package manufacturer.

== History ==
Lumileds was formed as a publicly traded company in November 1999 as a joint venture between Philips Lighting and Agilent Technologies. Upon Philips' acquisition in 2005, Lumileds became a business unit within Philips Lighting known as Philips Lumileds Lighting Company.

In March 2015, Lumileds parent company Philips agreed to sell an 80.1 percent stake in the business to the investment fund, Go Scale. In October 2015, Financial Times reported that the Committee on Foreign Investment in the United States (CFIUS) regulatory body may block the $2.9B deal owing to fears of Chinese subversion of the US high-tech sector. The deal was cancelled in January, 2016, due to the CFIUS concerns. CFIUS concerns were based on transfer of gallium nitride semiconductor technology, which is used in LEDs as well as defense applications.

In December 2016, to take the company private, Philips announced that it signed an agreement to sell an 80.1% interest in Lumileds to certain funds managed by affiliates of Apollo Global Management with Philips retaining the remaining 19.9% interest in Lumileds. The transaction completed in July 2017, under customary closing conditions, including the relevant regulatory approvals. IP strategists were used to separate the intellectual property portfolio from the physical assets after the spin off from full Philips ownership.

On August 29, 2022, Lumileds filed for Chapter 11 bankruptcy protection. The company reached an agreement to enter restructuring in a bid to deleverage and strengthen its balance sheet in effort to emerge from bankruptcy within less than 60 days. Lumileds' other international subsidiaries were not part of the bankruptcy reorganization. 63 days after the company filed for bankruptcy, Lumileds completed its bankruptcy restructuring and exited bankruptcy on November 1, 2022.

In May 2024, First Brands announced the acquisition of the Automotive Lamps business from Lumileds for $238 million.

== Attempted Chinese Acquisition ==
In August 2025, Chinese company San’an Optoelectronics offered $239 million for 100% ownership of Lumileds Holding B.V., with eventual ownership expected to be split between San’an and other foreign investors (74.5%), Philips (19.9%), and Apollo Global Management affiliates. However, in April 2026, the deal collapsed following opposition from United States regulators. The termination was attributed to national security concerns and tightened U.S. oversight of overseas acquisitions by Chinese technology firms.

== Products and notable applications ==
The company sells products for automotive, illumination and specialty applications, with automotive lighting comprising 60% of its sales in 2015.

In architectural lighting they released the Luxeon C in 2015, a family of high-power LED light sources capable of delivering multiple colors from a single focal length.

Lumileds LEDs are used in the Bridge of Peace, an illuminated pedestrian bridge in Tbilisi, and in the Times Square Ball made by Waterford Crystal.

== Patent dispute with Epistar ==
Lumileds had a history of patent disputes with competitor Epistar over the use of AlInGaP LED technology. However, in September, 2009, Philips Lumileds signed an agreement to license AlInGaP technology to Epistar.

== See also ==
- Epistar
- Cree Inc.
- Nichia
- Osram
- Seoul Semiconductor
