= National Policy on Electronics (India) =

- Logo of Electronics India under the National Policy on Electronics (NPE)

Agency overview
- Formed: 2011
- Parent department: Department of Information Technology

India's National Policy on Electronics is formulated by the government of India to boost its electronics systems and design manufacturing industry and improve its global market share. The policy was drafted in 2011 by the Department of Information Technology of the Ministry of Communication and Information Technology. It is the first of three policies for IT, telecom and electronics released by the government.

== Background ==
The electronics industry, at about $1.75 trillion is one of the largest and fastest growing in the world. The Indian market in 2008-09 was $45 billion and is expected to reach $400 billion by 2025 .

== Strategies ==
The strategies in the policy include:

- Provide incentives through Modified Special Incentive Package Scheme (M-SIPS)
- Set up semiconductor wafer fabrication facilities
- Preferential market access to domestically manufactured electronic products
- Provide incentives for setting up 200 electronic manufacturing clusters (EMCs) including greenfield EMCs and upgrades of brownfield EMCs
- Establish a stable tax regime and market India as a destination to attract investments
- Create a completely secure cyber ecosystem in the country
- Implementation of E-waste (Management and Handling) Rules, 2011
- Define National Electronic Mission
- The share of Indian electronics manufacturing in the world as of 2017-18 is 26.7%. With the policy, the government is aiming to increase it to 32%.
