= Nexchip =

Chinese semiconductor foundry

Nexchip Semiconductor Corporation
- Native name: 合肥晶合集成电路股份有限公司
- Type: Public; State-owned enterprise
- Traded as: SSE: 688249; SEHK: 2249
- Industry: Semiconductors
- Founded: 19 May 2015; 11 years ago
- Founder: Tsai Kuo-Chih "Michael"
- Headquarters: Hefei, Anhui, China
- Key people: Tsai Kuo-Chih "Michael" (Chairman); Tsai Hui-Chia (CEO)
- Revenue: ▼CN¥7.24 billion (2023)
- Net income: ▼CN¥119.16 million (2023)
- Total assets: ▲CN¥48.16 billion (2023)
- Total equity: ▲CN¥22.14 billion (2023)
- Owner: Powerchip (20.58%)
- Number of employees: 4,594 (2023)
- Website: www.nexchip.com.cn

Nexchip (Chinese: 晶合集成; pinyin: Jīnghé Jíchéng) is a partially state-owned publicly listed Chinese pure-play semiconductor foundry company based in Hefei, Anhui.

In terms of revenue, it is currently mainland China's third largest semiconductor foundry behind SMIC and Hua Hong Semiconductor. It is also one of the largest semiconductor foundries in the world based on the same metric.

== Background ==
In May 2015, Nexchip was originally established as a joint venture between Taiwanese company Powerchip and the Hefei City Construction and Investment Holding Group, a state-owned enterprise. Its founder, Michael Tsai had previously served as President of Powerchip and had also held senior position at other Taiwanese technology companies. According to Tsai, Nexchip was founded on the advantages of the local industrial supply chain, driven by BOE Technology to become the world's leading Display Driver ICs (DDI) chip foundry.

In response to the United States New Export Controls on Advanced Computing and Semiconductors to China, anonymous sources have reported that Nexchip was purchasing everything it could including second-hand tools to keep its fabs running.

On 5 May 2023, Nexchip held its initial public offering becoming a listed company on the Shanghai Stock Exchange STAR Market. The offering was 1,160x oversubscribed due to popular demand and raised 9.96 billion yuan making it one of the largest IPOs in 2023.

In October 2023, Nexchips opened a new fab in Hefei that specialized in manufacturing car chips. As China's leading DDI foundry, it wanted to expand into the automotive power chip market. According to Nexchip, overconcentration on the DDI sector was a potential risk due to order fluctuation and bargaining power. Therefore, it wanted to diversify into other areas. Its five largest customers accounted for 66.47% of sales. In the same month, Nexchip and Himax signed a memorandum of understanding to supply integrated circuits for the automotive display industry.

As of 2023, Nexchip has achieved mass production for 12-inch wafer foundry platforms of the 90nm to 150 nm process nodes. It is now in the risk-taking phase of mass production of 55 nm nodes Apart from the DDI sector, Nexchip is also involved in microcontrollers, CMOS Image sensors and Power Management ICs. Nexchip's 2023 half-year report showed DDI accounted for 87.84% of sales and its process nodes with the most sales were the 90 nm platform followed by the 110 nm platform.

In July 2026, Nexchip held a secondary listing on the Hong Kong Stock Exchange.

== See also ==
- Powerchip
- Semiconductor industry in China
- List of semiconductor fabrication plants
