= Nichia =

Japanese manufacturing company

Nichia Corporation
- Native name: 日亜化学工業株式会社
- Company type: Private KK
- Industry: Electronics
- Founded: Anan, Tokushima, Japan (December 1956; 69 years ago)
- Founder: Nobuo Ogawa
- Headquarters: Anan, Tokushima, Japan
- Key people: Hiroyoshi Ogawa (President)
- Products: Light-emitting diodes; Laser diodes; Fine chemicals; Battery materials; Magnetic materials
- Number of employees: 9,509 (as of December 2025)
- Website: www.nichia.co.jp/en/

Nichia Corporation (日亜化学工業株式会社, Nichia Kagaku Kōgyō Kabushiki-gaisha) is a Japanese chemical engineering and manufacturing company headquartered in Anan, Japan with global subsidiaries. It specializes in the manufacturing and distribution of phosphors, including light-emitting diodes (LEDs), laser diodes, battery materials, and calcium chloride. 2014 Nobel Prize in Physics recipient Shuji Nakamura did research while working at Nichia on gallium nitride light-emitting diodes, leading to the invention of blue LEDs.

In the field of phosphors, Nichia Corporation has 50% of the Japanese market and 25% of the world market.

Nichia designs, manufactures, and markets LEDs for display, LCD backlighting, automotive and general lighting applications with the many different LEDs across the entire visible spectrum. Nichia's invention and development of white LEDs have spanned several accomplishments throughout the history of the company.

== History ==
The Nichia Corporation was founded in 1956 by Nobuo Ogawa (1912–2002) at Aratano-cho, Anan, Tokushima to produce calcium phosphate for fluorescent lamp phosphors. The majority ownership is still held by the Ogawa family today.

In 1966, Nichia began production of phosphors for fluorescent lamps. In 1971, Nichia began production of phosphors for color TVs. In 1977, Nichia began the production of tri-color phosphors for fluorescent lamps.

One of Nobuo Ogawa's more well-known decisions was to support Shuji Nakamura to do research on gallium nitride (GaN) light-emitting diodes, when it was generally considered a very risky business. The research turned out to be a great success; however, the company received scrutiny for the small size of the ¥20,000 (US$180) bonus initially awarded to Nakamura for his 1993 invention of the first high brightness blue-light LED, which was based on gallium nitride. Nichia later settled out of court with Nakamura for ¥840 million (US$7 million), in what was then the highest bonus ever awarded by a Japanese company.

Nichia supports financially a Polish company Ammono, which as of 2011 is the world leader in bulk GaN manufacturing of 5-centimeter diameter high quality bulk c-plane GaN substrates as well as non-polar M-plane, A-plane and semi-polar GaN wafer. Nichia funds a joint research project with Ammono to develop ammonothermal gallium nitride growth, and in return Nichia took a stake in Ammono's intellectual property, as well as access to the crystals that were made.

Several of Nichia's innovations have won awards, such as the Nikkei Best Products Award.

In 2025, Nichia has deepened its long-standing collaboration with ams OSRAM by signing an expanded cross-licensing agreement covering LED and laser technologies. The agreement allows both companies to share access to key patents, strengthening intellectual property protection and supporting ongoing innovation in the lighting and semiconductor markets.

== Major competitors ==
Nichia Corporation's competitors include Seoul Semiconductor, Cree, Everlight Electronics, Lumileds, Epistar and Osram.

== Litigation ==
In January 2006, Nichia launched a lawsuit against rival LED manufacturer Seoul Semiconductor Co., Ltd., alleging design patent infringement.

Nichia announced in February 2009 that it had settled all patent litigation and associated disputes with Seoul Semiconductor in Japan, Germany, Korea, the United Kingdom, and the United States. The settlement includes a cross license agreement covering LED and laser diode technologies, which will permit the companies to access all of each other's patented technologies. In accordance with the settlement terms, all litigation is to be terminated by mutual withdrawal, with the exception of litigation in Germany involving patent DE 691-07-630 T2 of EP 0-437-385 B1, which was resolved following a February 2009 hearing.
