= Powerchip =

Taiwanese integrated circuit manufacturer

Powerchip Semiconductor Manufacturing Corporation (PSMC)

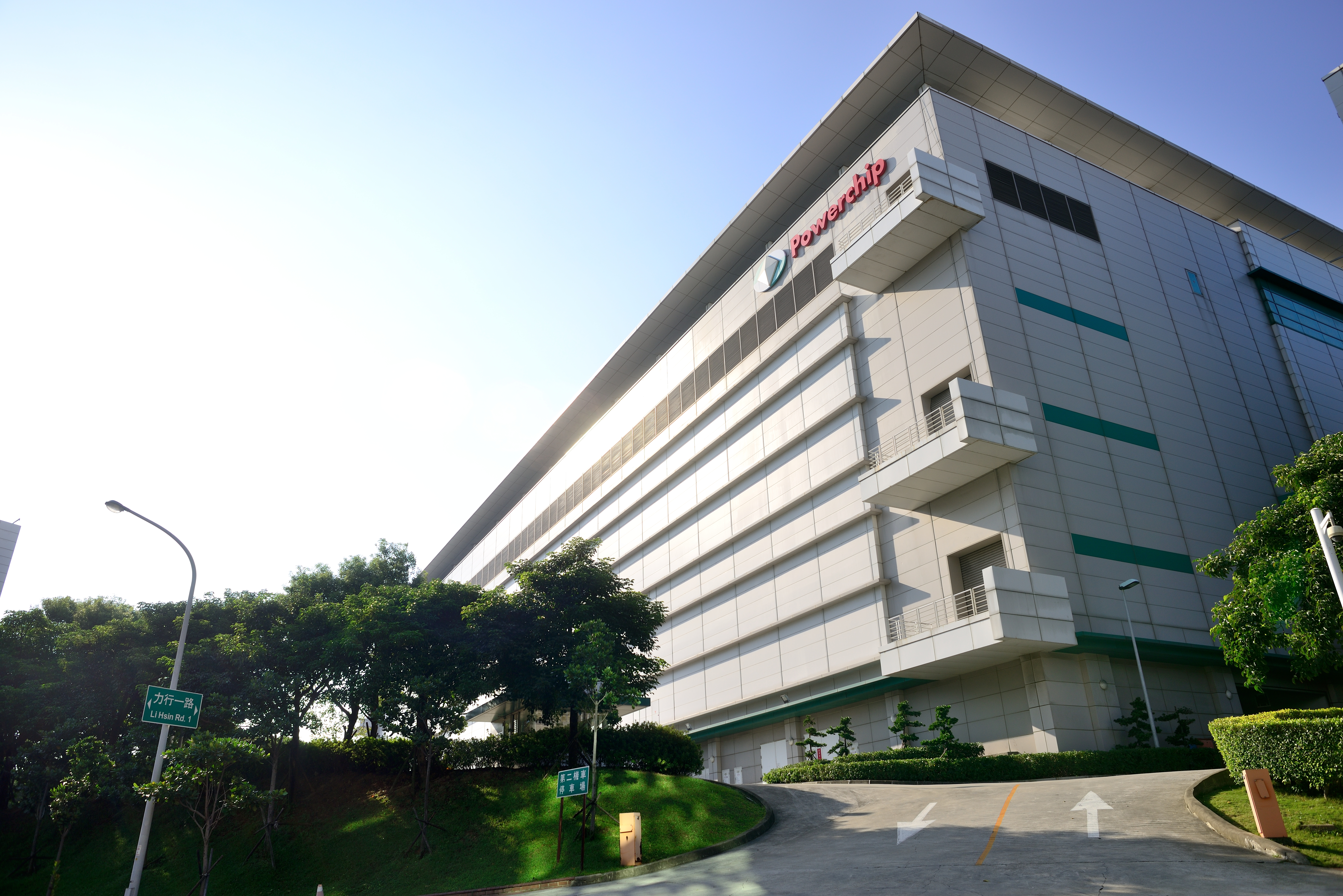
- Powerchip Headquarters
- Native name: 力晶積成電子製造股份有限公司
- Traded as: TPEx: 6770
- Industry: Semiconductors
- Founded: 1994; 32 years ago
- Headquarters: Hsinchu Science Park, Hsinchu, Taiwan,
- Key people: Frank Huang (CEO)
- Products: DRAM; flash memory; foundry services
- Number of employees: 7,000
- Website: www.powerchip.com

Powerchip Semiconductor Manufacturing Corporation (PSMC) is a Taiwanese company that manufactures and sells semiconductor products, in particular memory chips and other integrated circuits. As of 2023, the company was the 8th largest semiconductor foundry in the world with four 12 inch and two 8 inch wafer labs. The company offers foundry services as well as design, manufacturing and test services. It was formerly known as Powerchip Semiconductor Corp. and changed its name in June 2010. Powerchip Technology Corporation was founded in 1994 and is headquartered in Hsinchu, Taiwan.

Powerchip logo used since 2006 until 2019

== Overview ==
In 2017, its net profit was NT$8.08 billion. The company plans to invest NT$278 billion (US$9.04 billion) to build two new 12-inch wafer plants in Hsinchu Science Park, with construction scheduled to start in 2020

In March 2021, Powerchip broke ground on a new factory in Miaoli County that will manufacture chips with 45-nanometer and 50-nanometer technologies. The plant will employ and additional 3,000 workers.

Powerchip is a significant supplier to the automotive industry.

The company, in 2024 partnering with India's Tata group to build their first semiconductor fab outside Taiwan, on a project of NT$350 billion (US$11 billion).

== Other Countries ==
=== China ===
In May 2015, PSMC and the Hefei City Construction and Investment Holding Group established Nexchip in China as a joint venture.

=== Japan ===
In 2023, SBI Holdings and Japan's Miyagi Prefecture, Powerchip Semiconductor Manufacturinghas officially confirmed that JSMC's first fabrication facility will be located at the Second Northern Sendai Central Industrial Park(Miyagi).

=== India ===
PSMC is cooperating with company Tata Electronics to build 12-inch wafer fabrication in Dholera, Gujarat.

== See also ==
- List of semiconductor fabrication plants
- List of companies of Taiwan
