= Aixtron =

German technology company

Aixtron SE
- Type: Public
- Traded as: FWB: AIXA; MDAX component; TecDAX component
- Industry: Semiconductors
- Founded: 1983; 43 years ago
- Headquarters: Herzogenrath, Germany
- Area served: Worldwide
- Key people: Dr. Felix J. Grawert (CEO); Dr. Christan Danninger (CFO); Alexander Everke (chairman of the supervisory board)
- Products: Metalorganic chemical vapour deposition equipment
- Revenue: ▼€556.6 million (2025)
- Operating income: ▼€100.3 million (2025)
- Net income: ▼€85.2 million (2025)
- Total assets: ▲€1,040 million (end 2025)
- Total equity: ▲€910.2 million (end 2025)
- Number of employees: 1,117 (end 2025)
- Website: aixtron.com
- Footnotes; Financials as of fiscal year ended 31 December 2025. Reference

Aixtron SE is a German technology company headquartered in Herzogenrath, Germany. Its shares are listed on the Frankfurt Stock Exchange and it is a constituent of the MDAX and TecDAX indices. The company develops various types of chemical vapor deposition (CVD) equipment for electronic and optoelectronic applications based on III-V compound semiconductors and organic semiconductors. Aixtron is a leading manufacturer of metalorganic chemical vapor deposition (MOCVD) systems and also produces plasma-enhanced chemical vapor deposition (PECVD) equipment for the production of carbon nanotubes and other nanostructures.

== History ==
AIXTRON was founded as a spin-out industry from RWTH Aachen University in 1983. The company was listed on the Frankfurt Stock Exchange's now-defunct Neuer Markt, in November 1997. Since going public, the company has made several acquisitions, with the Scientific Equipment Division of the British company Thomas Swan & Co. and the Swedish chemical vapor deposition equipment maker Epigress AB both purchased in 1999.

The company completed a €118 million merger with American rival Genus, Inc. in March 2005 and bought British nanomaterial developer Nanoinstruments Ltd., a company spun out from the University of Cambridge, in 2007.

In December 2010, the company converted from a German Aktiengesellschaft to a Societas Europaea to reflect its European and international nature.

=== Blocked takeover ===
In October 2016, China's Fujian Grand Chip Investment Fund LP made a bid to purchase Aixtron. The proposed acquisition was tainted by collusion; shortly before Fujian Grand Chip made its public takeover bid, Sanan Optoelectronics canceled a critical order from Aixtron on dubious grounds, sending its share price down for Fujian Grand Chips to make a less-expensive offer (both Sanan Optoelectronics and Fujian Grand Chips are controlled by the same state-owned semiconductor fund).

As a result, Germany's economics ministry withdrew the approval of the takeover. In November 2016, the Committee on Foreign Investment in the United States (CFIUS) recommended both sides to drop their plan, because of national security concerns. On December 2, 2016, President Barack Obama issued an executive order blocking the proposed acquisition of Aixtron.

=== Subsequent developments ===
In 2017, AIXTRON sold its ALD/CVD Memory Product line, produced in Sunnyvale (California, United States) to Eugene Technology from South Korea. AIXTRON said it continues to execute restructuring measures as well as to seek the establishment of partnerships for its OLED business in order to return to profitability in 2018, and to this end in October 2017, the OLED business became a separate company - APEVA SE.

On 24 October 2018, AIXTRON announced that it had signed a joint venture agreement with Korean company IRUJA Co. Ltd. to invest in APEVA, AIXTRON's subsidiary for OLED deposition technologies. Closing of the joint venture agreement is expected during 2018.

== Operations ==
Aixtron produces metalorganic chemical vapour deposition equipment, used for making a range of electronic and opto-electronic products containing compound, organic as well as nanotubes and nanofibers.

Many AIXTRON systems use a "planetary reactor" process whereby gaseous semiconductor substances are deposited on revolving wafers, while others utilise a Close Coupled "shower head" method of deposition.

Manufacturing sites are located in Herzogenrath near Aachen in Germany, and Cambridge in the United Kingdom.

== Finances ==
For the 2025 fiscal year, AIXTRON reported net income of €85.2 million on revenue of €556.6 million. Asia accounted for 60% of AIXTRON's revenue, while Europe and the Americas each contributed 20%. Total order intake for the year amounted to €544.3 million, marking a 9% decline compared to 2024. On 30 December 2025, the company’s share price closed at €17.31, resulting in a year-end market capitalization of €1,964 million.

10-year financials (2016-2025)
Year	Revenue (€ million)	Net income (€ million)	Employees
2016	196.5	-24	705
2017	230.4	6.5	581
2018	268.8	45.9	628
2019	259.6	32.8	688
2020	269.2	34.9	728
2021	429	95.7	718
2022	463.2	100.4	895
2023	629.9	145.2	1,086
2024	633.2	106.3	1,207
2025	556.6	85.2	1,117

== See also ==
- KLA Corporation
