= List of MEMS foundries =

The list below provides an overview of companies that develop and fabricate MEMS (microelectromechanical systems) devices. These companies are usually referred to the concept of foundries. The offer of the companies varies according to the used material, the production volume and the size of the wafers used for the fabrication. The attribute type is for Integrated Device Manufacturer, Pure-play or Research Institute business model.

Company	Service	Substrate materials	Production volume	Wafer diameters (in inches)	Type	Headquartered country	
Asia Pacific Microsystems, Inc.	MEMS Foundry	Silicon, Sapphire, SOI, Glass, Quartz, Polymer, CMOS-wafers	High volume production	6	Pure-play	Taiwan	
Atomica	MEMS, biochip, sensor and photonics manufacturing, including custom design, development, prototyping, and high-volume production	Silicon, SOI, borosilicate, fused silica, quartz, glass, piezo, and engineered substrates	High-volume production	6, 8	Pure-play	United States	
B-Micron	MEMS foundry, backend processes, custom microfluidics development, sensor and photonics/optoelectronics, RF/communications, MEMS actuators, metrology, consumable R&D, MedTech CDMO	Si, SOI, E-SOI, glass, borosilicate, quartz, fused silica, FZ Si wafer, and so on	Small to high-volume production	4, 6, 8	Pure-play	United States	
C2MI	Customized MEMS: process, manufacturing, packaging, characterization, failure analysis and reliability.	Silicon, SOI, glass, and CMOS-wafers.	R&D, prototyping and pilot line.	8	Research Institute	Canada	
CEA-Leti	Customized MEMS, NEMS, BioMEMS: design, process, manufacturing, characterization, and packaging	Silicon, SOI, glass, and CMOS-wafers.	R&D recurrent batches and pilot line.	8, 12	Research Institute	France	
CSEM	MEMS design & process development, Lab-to-Fab approach. Focus areas include photonics, microfluidics, watch components, and harsh environments. Lithium niobate and silicon carbide processing are notable technology bricks.	Silicon, SOI, lithium niobate, silicon carbide, fused silica, quartz, glass.	Prototyping, small & medium volume production	6	Research Institute	Switzerland	
Fraunhofer Institute for Silicon Technology (ISIT)	MEMS design & process development, main Fraunhofer site for post-CMOS, MEMS, electroplating, CMP	Silicon, SOI, glass, GaN and CMOS.	Proof-of-concept, prototyping, small volume production	8	Research Institute	Germany	
Fraunhofer Institute for Microelectronic Circuits and Systems (IMS)	MEMS design & process development, Fraunhofer focus location for specialized MEMS-processes	Silicon, SOI.	Proof-of-concept, Prototyping, small volume production	8	Research Institute	Germany	
Hanking Electronics	Class 100 MEMS Foundry Services, MEMS IMUs (6 DoF accelerometers/ gyroscopes), IoT modules and MEMS Design Services. Foundry processes include; Film Deposition, Metal Deposition, Thermal, Wafer Bonding, Etch processes including DRIE and VHF, Wet Processes, and Wafer Level Packaging.	Silicon	High volume production	8	IDM	China	
IMEC	Low-medium volume MEMS manufacturing (CMOS compatible), incl. custom design, development, post-processing and prototyping	Si, SOI, fused silica or glass; post-processing on CMOS wafers (8-inch to 12-inch )	Prototyping, low and medium volume production; transfer to foundry for high volume	8, 12	Research Institute	Belgium	
Micronit	Customised MEMS design and manufacturing	Silicon and SOI, borosilicate glass or Polymer; structured wafer	Prototyping, low and medium volume production; transfer to foundry for high volume	6, 8	Pure-play	Netherlands	
LioniX International	Customized MEMS design, custom process development, prototyping and production.	Silicon, SOI, fused silica, borosilicate glasses, thermally oxidized silicon.	Proof of concept, prototyping, pilot production, small and medium volumes.	4, 6	Pure-play	Netherlands	
Mapper	MEMS process development and manufacturing	Silicon, SOI and various glasses, piezoelectric materials	Low volume and prototyping	4	Pure-play	Russia	
Microfluidic Foundry	BioMEMS design and manufacturing	Silicon, Glass, SU8/PDMS, Polymer	R&D, Mini volume production		IDM	United States	
Institut für Mikroelektronik Stuttgart (IMS CHIPS)	https://www.ims-chips.de/	MEMS design and process development; lab-to-fab approach. Silicon stencil masks for optical applications and device fabrication; Si_{3}N_{4} membrane masks with patterned Cr absorbers; micromechanical silicon components such as gratings, combs, filters and cogwheels; Cr and quartz patterning processes on 300 mm silicon and quartz wafers; chip alignment and bonding processes with sub-μm post-bond accuracy.	Si, lithium niobate, quartz	Prototyping, small- and medium-volume production	Research institute	Germany	Si, Si_{3}N_{4}, Cr, quartz, CMOS
nanoPHAB	Micro- and Nano-fabrication services, nano-MEMS manufacturing, ASIC	III-V materials, GaAs, InP, Si, Oxi-Nitrides, Glass, Polymers, Multimaterials	Epi-growth, Prototyping and Consultancy. Low to medium volume production. Bridge to high volume.	2, 3, 4	Pure-Play	Netherlands	
Nanoshift LLC	Contracted R&D and manufacturing with extensive experience in processing and integration. Specialize in MEMS, microfluidics, silicon photonics, TSV, CMOS integration, and other emerging technologies.	Silicon, SOI, Glass, flex substrates, polymer, and other materials.	Proof of concept, process development, prototyping, low to mid volume	2, 3, 4, and 6	IDM	United States	
NEMS and MEMS Proto Fab (NMPF)	MEMS manufacturing, microfabrication services	Silicon, Glass, Quartz, SOI wafers	Low to medium volume and prototyping	2, 4	Pure play	India	
Rogue Valley Microdevices	Design, prototyping, development and manufacturing of MEMS, photonic, microfluidic and related devices. Also films deposition and individual process steps.	Silicon, SOI, Engineered substrates, ceramic, glass, quartz, Silicon carbide	Low, medium and high volume	3,4,5,6,8,12	Pure-play	United States	
Robert Bosch GmbH	Customized MEMS process development and manufacturing. Optional: design, assembly, test, integration	Silicon, SOI, Fused silica or glass, post-processing on 200mm-CMOS wafers	Prototyping, development, medium and high volume	8	IDM	Germany	
Safran Sensing Technologies	MEMS Manufacturing	Silicon, SOI	Medium volume production	6	IDM	Switzerland Norway	
Science Foundry	MEMS process development for prototype and volume production; Standard Technologies MPWs	Silicon, SOI, glass, quartz, polymer	Prototyping and volume production	6	Pure-play	United States	
Semefab	MEMS manufacturing		High volume production	4, 6	Pure-play	United Kingdom	
Semi-Conductor Laboratory	CMOS & MEMS design, manufacturing and packaging; microfabrication	Silicon, SOI and various glasses	From Low volume production	6,8	Research Institute	India	
Silex Microsystems	MEMS process development and manufacturing. Photolithography, etching, deposition and oxidation, bonding and glass packaging.	Silicon	Prototyping and high volume production	8	Pure-play	Sweden China	
Silicon Sensing Systems	MEMS process development and production	Silicon	Prototype fabrications through to mass production	8	IDM	United Kingdom Japan	
SINTEF MiNaLab	Customized MEMS, BioMEMS, piezoMEMS and Micro-optics. Modeling and design, process development, testing and characterization.	Silicon, SOI, Glass	Prototyping, low and medium volume production; transfer to foundry for high volume	6	Research Institute	Norway	
Sony Semiconductor	MEMS development and manufacturing	Silicon, SOI	Prototyping and high volume production	6, 8	IDM	Japan	
STMicroelectronics	MEMS (including accelerometers, gyroscopes, digital compasses, inertial modules, pressure sensors, humidity sensors and microphones)	Silicon	High volume production		IDM	Switzerland	
Teledyne DALSA	MEMS design and manufacturing with integration of individual foundry processes	Silicon and polysilicon	High volume production	6, 8	Pure-play	Canada	
Teledyne Micralyne	MEMS design, manufacturing and packaging; microfabrication	Silicon, SOI and various glasses	From scale-up to high volume production	6	Pure-play	Canada	
Tower Semiconductor	IC manufacturing	Silicon	High volume production	6, 8	Pure-play	Israel	
TDK Tronics	MEMS design and manufacturing	Silicon, SOI and glass wafer	Prototyping, low and high volume production	6	Pure-play	France Japan	
TSMC	MEMS design and manufacturing	Silicon	High volume production	6, 8, 12	Pure-play	Taiwan	
uFluidix	MEMS and Microfluidics manufacturing	Silicon, glass, PDMS	Low-Medium volume production		Pure-play	Canada	
United Microelectronics Corporation	MEMS manufacturing	Silicon	High volume production	8	Pure-play	Taiwan	
Wunderlichips	Focus on PDMS devices, process development	Silicon, SU8\PDMS	R&D, low volume	4, 6, 8	Pure-play	Switzerland	
X-Fab	MEMS design and manufacturing	Silicon and glass	High volume production	6, 8	Pure-play	Germany	
XIVER	Customized thin film and MEMS process development and manufacturing, certified for medical devices	Silicon, SOI, glass, quartz and CMOS-wafers	Prototyping, low and medium volume production	8	Pure-play	Netherlands	
ZeptoNova	Full-system MEMS (inertial sensors, micro mirrors, ultrasound transducers, microphones, pressure sensors, gas and mass sensors) design, manufacturing, and packaging. Micro fabrication services.	Silicon, SOI, glass, polymer	Proof of concept, prototyping, small volume production, transfer to partner foundries for high-volume production.	3, 4, 6, 8	Pure-play	Belgium	
