= Central Taiwan Science Park =

Industrial park in Taiwan

Central Taiwan Science Park 中部科學園區
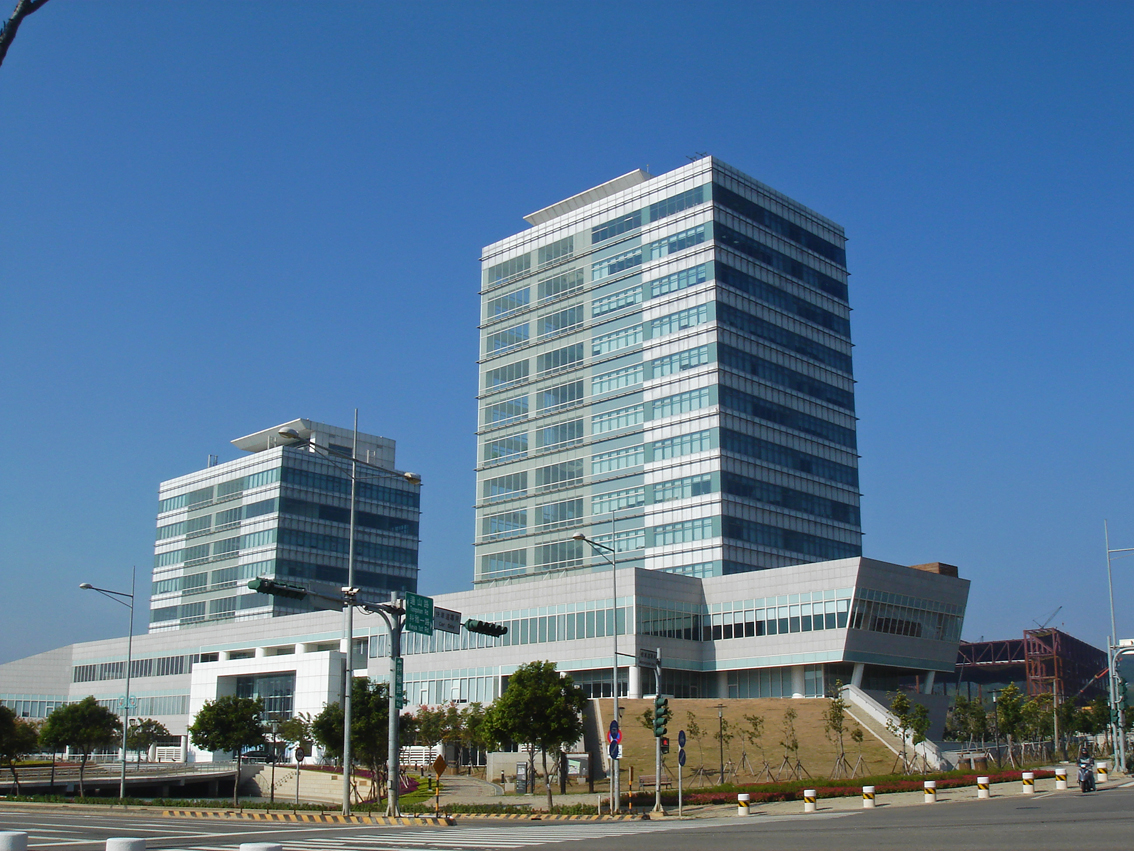
- Central Taiwan Science Park Bureau

- Location within Taichung
- Location: Changhua County; Nantou County; Taichung City; Yunlin County
- Coordinates: 24°12′36.0″N 120°37′05.4″E
- Opening date: 2003
- Manager: Wayne Wang
- Size: 1,486 ha (3,670 acres)
- Website: Official website

The Central Taiwan Science Park (CTSP; traditional Chinese: 中部科學園區; simplified Chinese: 中部科学园区; pinyin: Zhōngbù Kēxué Gōngyè Yuánqū; Pe̍h-ōe-jī: Tiong-pō͘ Kho-ha̍k Kang-gia̍p Hn̂g-khu) is an industrial park in Taiwan.

The Central Taiwan Science Park opened in 2003. Around 53,000 people work in the park in 2022, which spans an area of 1,486 hectares. In 2021, Taiwan Semiconductor Manufacturing Company (TSMC) accounted for 42.27% of the park's overall revenue.

== History ==
The preparation proposal to establish CTSP was approved by the Executive Yuan on 23 September 2002. The CTSP was then founded in 2003, with the groundbreaking ceremony taking place on 28 July 2003 in conjunction with the construction of AU Optronics. The Central Taiwan Science Park opened in 2003 in Taichung. Of the technology parks in Taiwan, CTSP is known for a focus on precision machinery and optoelectronics. The campuses Huwei, Houli, Erli and Chung Hsing New Village were added after 2003.

Following ongoing disputes between environmental groups and the park, a Taiwan court ordered a temporary stop to expansion in 2011. The Taiwan Environmental Protection Administration stated health studies had not eliminated worries about polluted runoff into nearby farmland. The park then was 1,400 hectares, with 92 companies in the central campuses. In 2012, a group of artists and writers petitioned the government to reconsider a water diversion that would take irrigation water for use in the park.

Central Taiwan Science Park Bureau debuted a new disaster warning system in 2019. In 2019, CTSP had six primary sectors: optoelectronics, semiconductors, biotechnology, precision machinery, computers and peripherals, and green energy. In August 2020, the Tapei Times reported that while environmental campaigners were calling on the park's administration in Taichung to increase the park's usage of renewable energy. In 2021, sales generated by CTSP for the first ten months of the year were US$30.28 billion. The park said it would recruit 1,898 employees in June 2022 through a recruitment event, in response to growing orders overseas. 53,027 people already worked in the park.

== Architecture ==
The industrial park spans over an area of 1,486 hectares. It consists of Chung Hsing Park, Erlin Park, Houli Park, Huwei Park and Taichung Park.

== Residents ==
The park has sectors in "semiconductors, precision machinery, biotech, optoelectronics and renewable energy," among others. In 2018, 145 firms operated out of the park, responsible for 45,000 employment positions. With a 12-inch wafer fab in the park, In 2019, Giant Group moved its global headquarter to the park. In 2021, Taiwan Semiconductor Manufacturing Company (TSMC) accounted for 42.27% of the park's overall revenue. Among other companies with production lines in the park are Epistar.

== See also ==
- Ministry of Science and Technology (Taiwan)
- Business cluster
