= Wafer fabrication =

Procedure for fabricating semiconductors

Simplified cross-sectional illustration of the process of fabrication of a CMOS inverter on p-type substrate in semiconductor microfabrication. Each etch step is detailed in the following image as a cut-through of a single transistor device. Note: Gate, source and drain contacts are not normally in the same plane in real devices, and the diagram is not to scale.

Wafer fabrication is a procedure composed of many repeated sequential processes to produce complete electrical or photonic circuits on semiconductor wafers in a semiconductor device fabrication process. Examples include production of radio frequency (RF) amplifiers, LEDs, optical computer components, and microprocessors for computers. Wafer fabrication is used to build components with the necessary electrical structures.

The main process begins with integrated circuit design, where electrical engineers design the circuit and define its functions, and specify the signals, inputs/outputs and voltages needed. These electrical circuit specifications are entered into electrical circuit design software, such as SPICE, and then imported into technology CAD (TCAD) software. This is necessary for the layers to be defined for photomask production. The resolution of the circuits increases rapidly with each step in design, as the scale of the circuits at the start of the design process is already being measured in fractions of micrometers. Each step thus increases circuit density for a given area.

The next part of the process is mask data preparation.

Then comes the most expensive part of the semiconductor device fabrication process, wafer fabrication.

The silicon wafers start out blank and pure. The circuits are built in layers in clean rooms. First, photoresist patterns are photo-masked in micrometer detail onto the wafers' surface. The wafers are then exposed to short-wave ultraviolet light and the unexposed areas are thus etched away and cleaned. Hot chemical vapors are deposited on to the desired zones and baked in high heat, which permeate the vapors into the desired zones. In some cases, ions, such as O_{2}^{+} or O^{+}, are implanted in precise patterns and at a specific depth by using RF-driven ion sources.

These steps are often repeated many hundreds of times, depending on the complexity of the desired circuit and its connections.

New processes to accomplish each of these steps with better resolution and in improved ways emerge every year, with the result of constantly changing technology in the wafer fabrication industry. New technologies result in denser packing of minuscule surface features such as transistors and micro-electro-mechanical systems (MEMS). This increased density continues the trend often cited as Moore's Law.

A fab is a common term for where these processes are accomplished. Often the fab is owned by the company that sells the chips, such as Intel, Texas Instruments, or Freescale. A foundry is a fab at which semiconductor chips or wafers are fabricated to order for third party companies that sell the chip, such as fabs owned by Taiwan Semiconductor Manufacturing Company (TSMC), United Microelectronics Corporation (UMC), GlobalFoundries and Semiconductor Manufacturing International Corporation (SMIC).

In 2013 the cost of building the next generation wafer fab was over $10 billion.

After wafer fabrication and dicing, the "bare" semiconductor die leave the fab. Usually the die are packaged (see integrated circuit packaging) and then later those packages are assembled on a PCB; occasionally the die are used in chip on board where the bare die are placed directly on a PCB.

== WFE market ==
Referred to respectively as the wafer fab equipment or wafer front end (equipment) market, both using the acronym WFE, the market is that of the manufacturers of the machines which in turn manufacture semiconductors. The apexresearch link in 2020 identified Applied Materials, ASML, KLA-Tencor, Lam Research, TEL and Dainippon Screen Manufacturing as market participants while the 2019 electronicsweekly.com report, citing The Information Network's president Robert Castellano, focused on the respective market shares commanded by the two leaders, Applied Materials and ASML.
