= Piezoelectric microelectromechanical systems =

Microelectromechanical system that uses piezoelectricity to generate motion

A piezoelectric microelectromechanical system (piezoMEMS) is a miniature or microscopic device that uses piezoelectricity to generate motion and carry out its tasks. It is a microelectromechanical system that takes advantage of an electrical potential that appears under mechanical stress. PiezoMEMS can be found in a variety of applications, such as switches, inkjet printer heads, sensors, micropumps, and energy harvesters.

== Development ==
Interest in piezoMEMS technology began around the early 1990s as scientists explored alternatives to electrostatic actuation in radio frequency (RF) microelectromechanical systems (MEMS). For RF MEMS, electrostatic actuation specialized high voltage charge pump circuits due to small electrode gap spacing and large driving voltages. In contrast, piezoelectric actuation allowed for high sensitivity as well as low voltage and power consumption as low as a few millivolts. It also had the ability to close large vertical gaps while still allowing for low microsecond operating speeds. Lead zirconate titanate (PZT), in particular, offered the most promise as a piezoelectric material because of its high piezoelectric coefficient, tunable dielectric constant, and electromechanical coupling coefficient. PiezoMEMS have been applied to various different technologies from switches to sensors, and further research have led to the creation of piezoelectric thin films, which aided in the realization of highly integrated piezoMEMS devices.

Diagram of a microelectromechanical switch.

The first reported piezoelectrically actuated RF MEMS switch was developed by scientists at the LG Electronics Institute of Technology in Seoul, South Korea in 2005. The researchers designed and actualized a RF MEMS switch with a piezoelectric cantilever actuator that had an operation voltage of 2.5 volts.

In 2017, researchers from the U.S. Army Research Laboratory (ARL) evaluated the radiation effects in the piezoelectric response of PZT thin films for the first time. They determined that PZT exhibited a degree of radiation hardness that could be further extended by using conductive oxide electrodes instead of traditional platinum electrodes. Gamma radiation tests have also shown that actuated devices such as switches, resonators, and inertial devices could benefit from the radiation tolerance of PZT, suggesting the possibility that actuators and sensors can be integrated into platforms evaluating nuclear material and reduce human exposure to radiation.

This experiment was part of a decades-long research investment effort at ARL to improve the use of PZT thin film technology for piezoMEMS. Other piezoMEMS-related work included developing a piezoelectric microphone based on PZT thin films, creating new integrated surface micromachining processes for RF MEMS to incorporate thin film PZT actuators, providing the first experimental demonstration of monolithically integrated piezoMEMS RF switches with contour mode filters, and demonstrating the feasibility of vibrational energy harvesting using thin film PZT MEMS. In their work, researchers from ARL have also increased the overall electromechanical response of PZT thin films by 15-30% by incorporating iridium oxide electrode materials.

== Design ==
There exists three primary approaches to realizing PiezoMEMS devices:

1. The additive approach: The piezoelectric thin films are deposited on silicon substrates with layers of insulating and conducting material followed by surface or silicon bulk micromachining.
2. The subtractive approach: Single crystal or polycrystalline piezoelectrics and piezoceramics are subjected to direct bulk micromachining and then electrodes.
3. The integrative approach: Micromachined structures are integrated in silicon or piezoelectrics by using bonding techniques on bulk piezoelectric or silicon substrates.

PiezoMEMS use two principal crystal structures, the wurtzite and perovskite structures.

== Challenges ==
PiezoMEMS still face many difficulties that impede its ability to be successfully commercialized. For instance, the success of depositing uniform films of piezoelectrics still depend heavily on the use of appropriate layers of proper nucleation and film growth. As a result, extensive device-specific development efforts are needed to create a proper sensor structure. In addition, researchers continue to search for ways to reduce and control the material and sensor drift and aging characteristics of thin film piezoelectric materials. Deposition techniques to create thin films with properties approaching those of bulk materials remain in development and in need of improvement. Furthermore, the chemistry and etching characteristics of most piezoelectric materials remain very slow.
