= Advanced Micro Foundry =

Singapore company producing photonics devices on chips

Advanced Micro Foundry (AMF) is a Singapore-based manufacturer of microelectronic chips. AMF is involved in silicon photonics. They produce devices like high-speed modulators, photodetectors, micro-rings and optical couplers. AMF had in 2019 0.13um CMOS technology to produce a Germanium-made photodetector with a bandwidth over 35GHz and a dark current below 100nA. AMF has partnered with CMC Microelectronics since 2012. AMF also provides silicon nitride technology.
