= Macronix =

Taiwanese memory manufacturing company

Macronix International Co., Ltd. 旺宏電子股份有限公司
- Type: Public
- Traded as: TWSE: 2337
- Industry: Semiconductors
- Founded: 1988; 38 years ago
- Headquarters: Taiwan
- Area served: Worldwide
- Number of employees: 3503
- Website: www.macronix.com

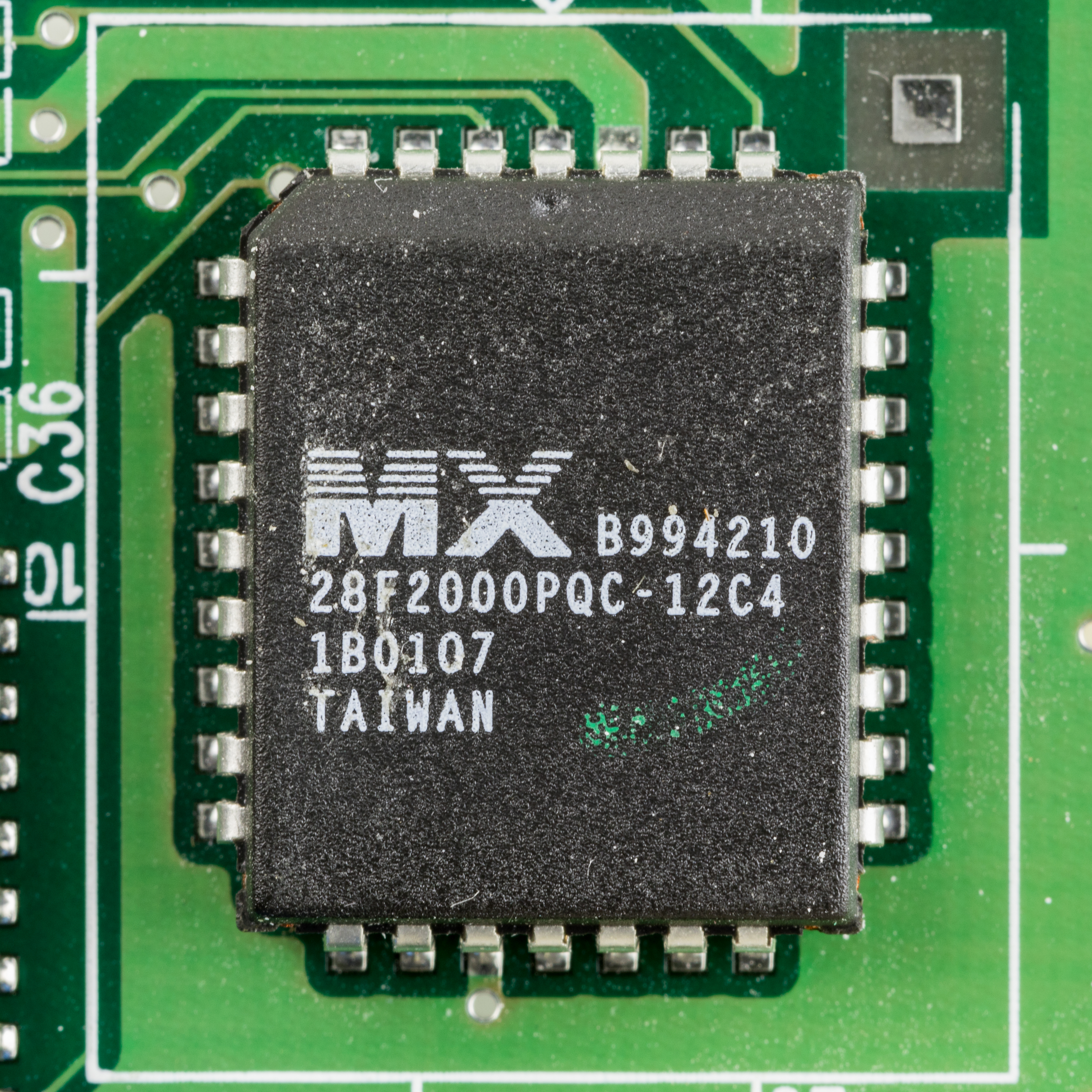
2M-BIT [256K x 8] CMOS flash memory

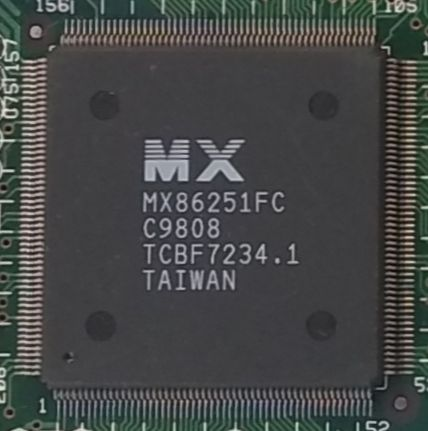
Macronix graphics subsystem on a 3Dfx Voodoo Rush

Macronix International Co., Ltd. (MXIC; often shortened to Macronix) is an integrated device manufacturer in the non-volatile memory (NVM) market. The company manufactures NOR Flash, NAND Flash, and ROM products for the consumer, communication, computing, automotive, and networking markets. Its headquarters are located in Taiwan.

== History ==
Headquartered in Taiwan, Macronix was established in 1989. By 1997, the company was a global supplier of Mask ROM and EPROMs.

In 2012 the company developed a process to prolong the life of solid state drives.

Macronix developed specialized memory chips for the consumer electronics industry, including those used in Nintendo's 3DS and Switch consoles, and Samsung's wearable electronic devices.

The company presently has more than 4,000 employees—approximately one-fifth of whom serve in research and development roles. Macronix's total revenues in 2023 were US$888 million, slightly more than one-half of which was derived from NOR flash, followed by ROM revenues at approximately one-third.

As of March 2024, Macronix has had 9,200 patents granted.

Macronix owns two in-house wafer-manufacturing foundries—one for 200-nanometer wafers, the other for 300-nanometer wafers. The company also has sales and support branches in Europe, the United States, Japan, Korea, Singapore, and China.

Recognizing the market opportunity in proprietary semiconductor designs becoming high-volume, open-market flash memory, Macronix leveraged flash memory customized for specific customers into widely available devices for broader applications.

Macronix has developed partnerships with various microcontroller manufacturers to pair its OctaBus flash memory with the partners’ MCUs.

In the automotive market, Macronix's automotive-grade ArmorFlash and OctaFlash memory families are being adopted by automotive-electronics semiconductor and system makers such as Nvidia and NXP to bring highly secure data storage to vehicles.

In 2021, Macronix became the first NVM manufacturer to bring 1.2-volt, 120 MHz Serial NOR flash to mass production, contributing to a new generation and broader range of devices requiring ultra-low-power flash memory.

Macronix in 2022 introduced its memory-centric computing concept, developed to enable AI-focused computation within flash devices. Also in 2022, Macronix received EE Times Asia's Best Memory Product award for the second consecutive year.

In 2026, Macronix announced its exit from the ROM industry, discontinuing production on products including Nintendo Switch 2 game cartridges.
