= Kodenshi AUK Group =

Japanese-South Korean company

- Company type: Public/Conglomerate
- Industry: Primary areas of expertise include Electronic component manufacturing, Robotics, and Solar energy
- Founded: May 1972; 54 years ago in Uji-shi, Kyoto, Japan
- Founder: Hirokazu Nakajima
- Headquarters: Kyoto, Japan; Iksan, South Korea
- Products: Optoelectronic; Semiconductors; Electronics; LED; Robotics
- Subsidiaries: Kodenshi America, Inc.
- Website: Official website

Kodenshi AUK Group is a conglomerate of two companies, Kodenshi Corporation based in Kyoto, Japan and AUK Corporation based in Iksan, South Korea.

== Background ==
Kodenshi Corporation was established in May 1972, in Uji-shi, Kyoto, Japan as a semiconductor-producing company. The company has been active in the optical semiconductor market for the past forty years through continual research, development, production, and sales of solar cells. Since the establishment of Kodenshi Corp, the company has been developing new forms of photo diodes, light receiving element of photo transistors, red LEDs, photo ICs, etc. In 1980 the company expanded its base to Iksan Korea and then in 1992 to Shenyang, China.

== AUK Corp ==
The AUK Corp. was founded on 1984 in Iksan, South Korea and has since become a global electronic component company. AUK Corp. engages in the research, development, and provision of nonmemory semiconductor products primarily in Korea, Hong Kong, Japan, and Singapore. However, "as of July 1, 2010, AUK Corp was acquired by Kodenshi Korea Corp. & Knowledge*On, Inc. in a reverse merger transaction." Nakajima Hirokazu is CEO as of 2011.

== Subsidiaries ==
=== Kodenshi America, Inc. ===
Kodenshi America Inc. is a branch office of the international Optoelectronic and semiconductor manufacturer, Kodenshi AUK Group. This particular subsidiary is in charge of marketing, developing plans for new products, targeting top manufacturing territories in their territory. It was established in 2011 in San Diego, CA, employs 3 people and has an annual revenue of about $327,369.

==== Territories served ====
Territories covered by Kodenshi America, Inc. are:

- North America (Canada, Mexico, United States of America)
- South America
- Europe
- Middle East
- Africa

== Notable mentions ==
- Kodenshi wins Trade Award from South Korea for exportation of goods in excess of $100 million.
- Kodenshi AUK Corp. is the main supplier for Nintendo DS IRDA ports.
- Kodenshi AUK Corp. "announced that it has declared an annual cash dividend of KRW 110(0.0975 US Dollars) per share of common stock to shareholders of record on December 31, 2010, for the fiscal year 2010. The dividend rate of market price is 2.4% and the total amount of the cash dividend is KRW 5,231,702,740(4639.23 USD). The dividend payment date is April 25, 2011. The Company's annual cash dividend for the fiscal year 2009 was KRW 20(0.0177 USD) per share."
- In 2009 Kodenshi AUK introduces a newly developed sensors to detect floor space and objects for use in products such as iRobots'. The various sensors can detect almost anything and was a first of its kind in South Korea. They were able to develop this new, first of a kind technology at a cost of 50% less than other imported sensors.
