= Hua Hong Semiconductor =

Chinese semiconductor foundry

Hua Hong Semiconductor Limited
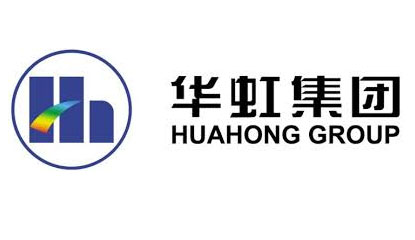
- Native name: 华虹半导体有限公司
- Type: Public
- Traded as: SEHK: 1347 (H share)
- Industry: Semiconductor
- Founded: 1996; 30 years ago
- Headquarters: Shanghai, China
- Revenue: ▲US$2.402 billion (2025)
- Net income: ▼US$110.813 million(2025)
- Website: http://www.huahonggrace.com

Hua Hong Semiconductor Limited is a publicly listed Chinese pure-play semiconductor foundry company based in Shanghai, established in 1996 as part of China's national efforts to boost its IC industry. Currently, Hua Hong's most advanced node is achieved by its subsidiary Shanghai Huali (HLMC), which can manufacture 28/22-nm process.

It is currently mainland China's second largest chip-maker behind rival SMIC and 6th largest globally, with a market share of 2.6% in 2021.

== History ==
In 1996, Shanghai Huahong Microelectronics Co., Ltd. (now Huahong Group) was established as part of China's national efforts to boost its IC industry.

In 1997, a joint venture HHNEC was formed between Huahong and NEC China to produce DRAM for NEC. The company phased out DRAM production in 2003 and became a pure-play foundry.

In December 2000, Grace Shanghai was formed by Grace Cayman as a pure-play foundry.

In 2011, HHNEC and Grace Shanghai was merged to form Shanghai Huahong Grace Semiconductor Manufacturing Corporation, which later fell under Hua Hong Group, a fully owned subsidiary of Hua Hong Semiconductor Limited.

In 2014, Hua Hong was listed on the Hong Kong Stock Exchange. In 2023, the company seeks to raise capital by listing themselves on the Shanghai Stock Exchange. This was to build their own advanced chip technologies amid U.S. restrictions. In October 2025, the United States Department of Defense stated that Hua Hong Semiconductor merits inclusion on a list of companies linked to China's military. In April 2026, the United States Department of Commerce ordered multiple U.S. chip equipment makers to halt tool shipments to Hua Hong, citing national security concerns.

== Locations ==
The company currently operates three 200mm wafer fabs (HH Fab1, HH Fab2, and HH Fab3) in Shanghai located in Jinqiao, Zhangjiang and Zhangjiang respectively, with total monthly 200mm wafer capacity of approximately 180,000 wafers.

There is an R&D center (ICRD) located adjacent to Hua Hong and SMIC fabs in Zhangjiang, operated in conjunction with other integrated circuit companies, universities and research institutes, researching 7-5 nm development on 300mm wafers.

Hua Hong also owns two 300mm fabs (HH Fab5, HH Fab6) in Zhangjiang and Kangqiao, Shanghai through its subsidiary Shanghai Huali (HLMC).

There is also a new 300mm fab (HH Fab7) under construction in Wuxi's National High-Tech Industrial Development Zone. Operation at the new HH Fab7 plant began in 2019.

== Processes ==
Currently, Hua Hong's most advanced node is achieved by its subsidiary Shanghai Huali (HLMC), which can manufacture 28/22-nm process.

== See also ==
- Semiconductor industry
- Semiconductor industry in China
- List of semiconductor fabrication plants
