= X-Fab =

German semiconductor foundry

X-FAB Silicon Foundries
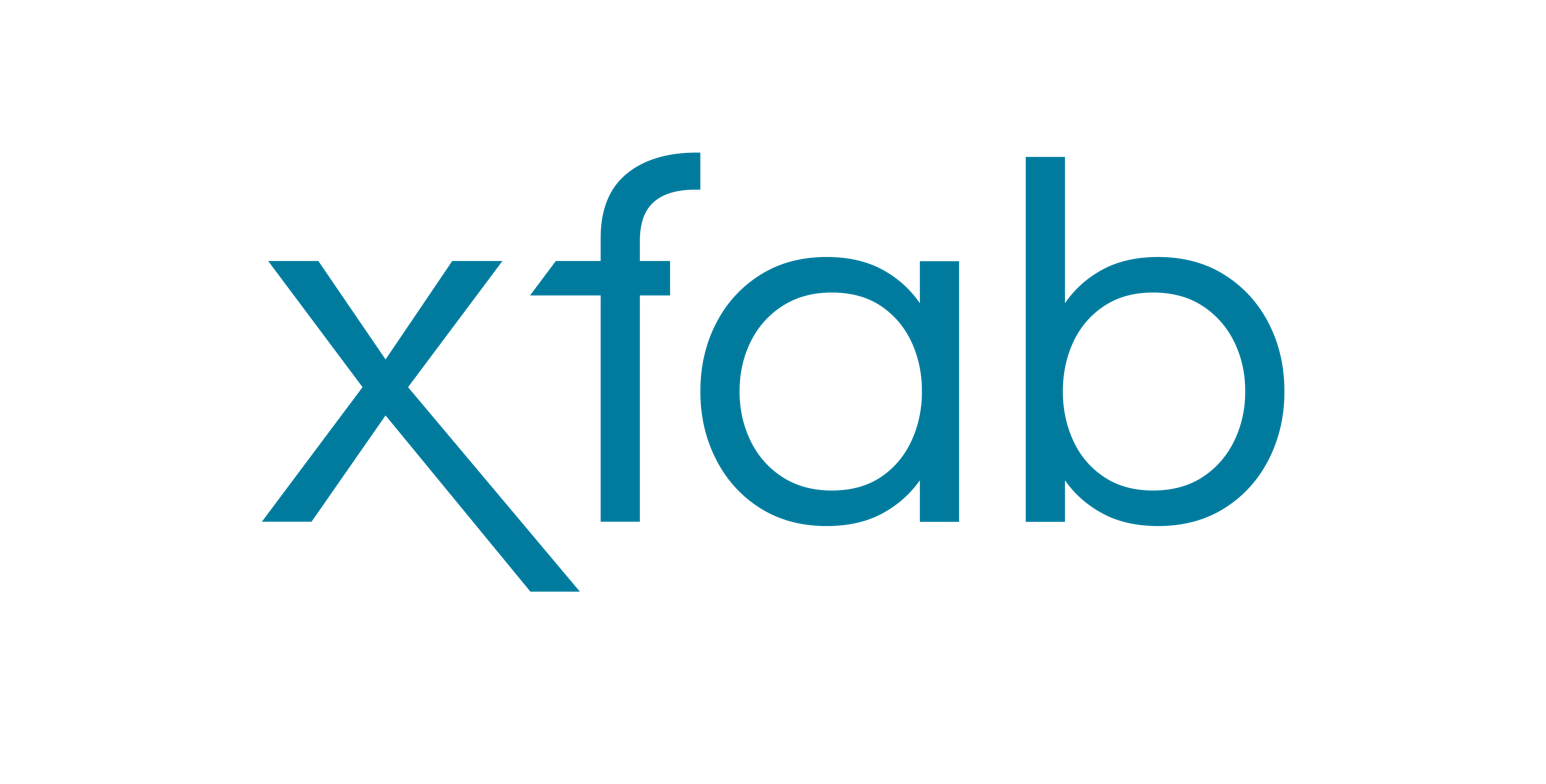

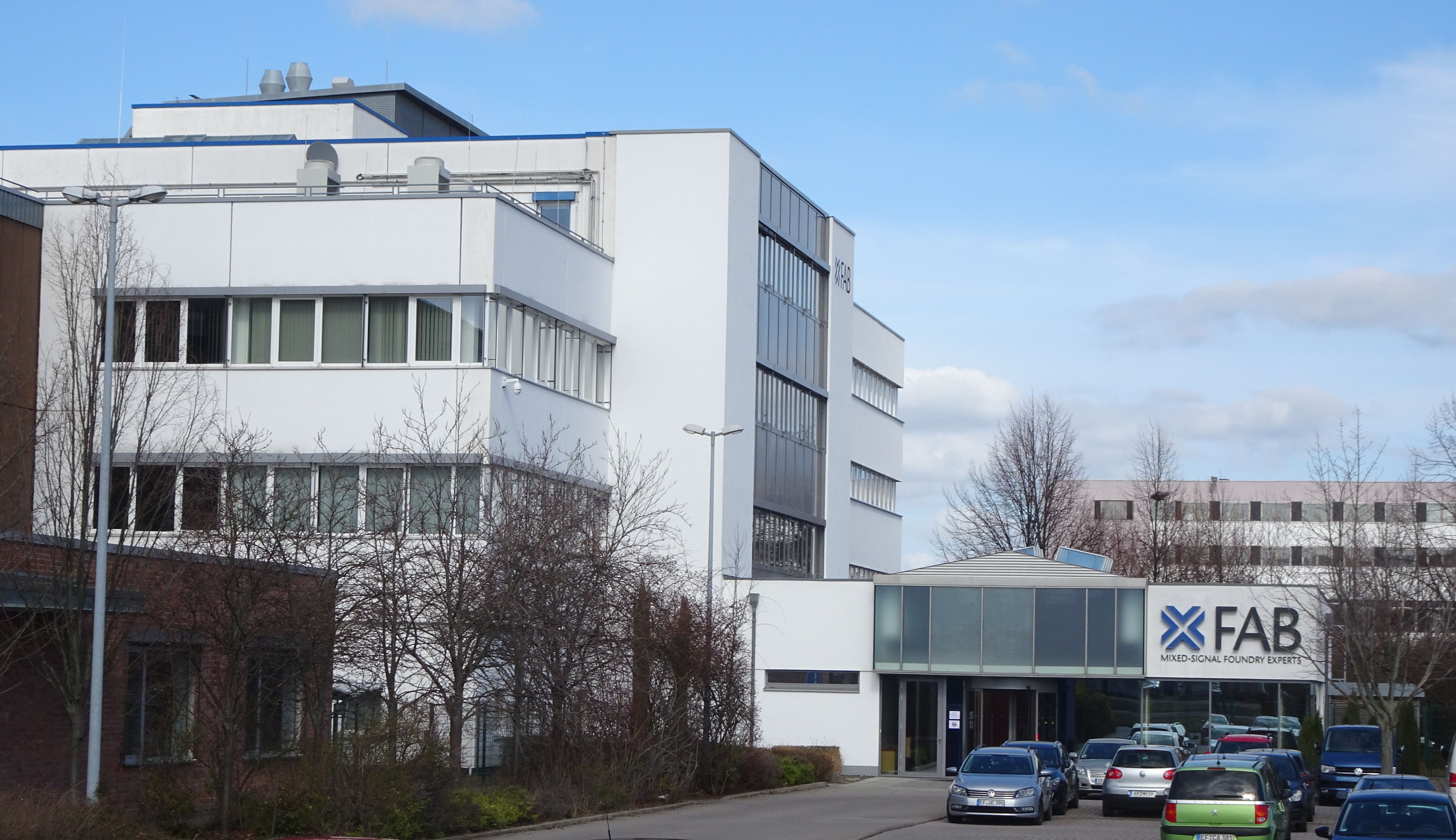
- X-FAB in Erfurt (2020)
- Traded as: Euronext: XFAB; CAC Small
- Industry: Microelectronics
- Founder: Roland Duchâtelet
- Headquarters: Erfurt
- Area served: Worldwide
- Key people: Damien Macq (President & CEO)
- Revenue: US$ 740 million (2022)
- Number of employees: 4,200
- Website: X-FAB.com

The X-FAB Silicon Foundries is a group of semiconductor foundries. The group specializes in the fabrication of analog and mixed-signal integrated circuits for fabless semiconductor companies, as well as MEMS and solutions for high voltage applications. The holding company named "X-FAB Silicon Foundries SE" is based in Tessenderlo, Belgium while its headquarters is located in Erfurt, Germany.

== History ==
X-Fab logo until 2020

As a result of the German reunification in the 1990s, came to the dismantling of the old electronics conglomerate in East Germany named Kombinat Mikroelektronik Erfurt. The conglomerate was privatized in 1992 and divided into X-FAB Gesellschaft zur Fertigung von Wafern mbH (simply known as X-Fab) and the Thesys Gesellschaft für Mikroelektronik mbH (simply known as Thesys). X-Fab would be majority owned by the company Melexis while Thesys would be majority owned by the German state of Thuringia.

In 1999, X-Fab acquired a foundry from Texas Instruments in Lubbock, Texas, USA. In the same year, X-Fab (at this time owned by Belgian holding company named Elex N.V) acquired Thesys and disposed of its non-foundry business.

In 2002, X-Fab acquired Zarlink wafer plant in Plymouth, United Kingdom.

In 2006, X-Fab merged with 1st Silicon, a semiconductor fabrication plant located in Sarawak, Malaysia. The Sarawak government acquired 35% of X-Fab shares in the merger.

In 2007, X-Fab acquired the foundry business from ZMD, thus enabling ZMD to focus on its core business of design and developing analog mixed signal devices.

In December 2009, X-Fab sold its United Kingdom wafer plant to Plus Semi, the old Plessey Semiconductors plant in Swindon, England.

In February 2011, the company added Rudi De Winter as co-CEO. He later assumed the role of CEO in 2014.

In 2012, the X-Fab group acquired MEMS foundry Itzehoe GmbH where the latter was a spin-off from Fraunhofer Institute for Silicon Technology (ISIT). Nevertheless, X-Fab continues its cooperation with ISIT in the chip business. X-Fab also expanded its MEMS manufacturing capabilities. The foundry in Itzehoe became fully owned by X-Fab in 2015.

In 2015, PowerAmerica (a research institute under Manufacturing USA network) collaborated with X-Fab production facility in Lubbock, Texas to produce 150-mm Silicon carbide wafers for power electronics applications.

In 2016, the X-FAB group acquired the assets of Altis Semiconductor, making the fab in France its sixth manufacturing site.

In July 2020, X-FAB temporarily halted IT systems and production lines to prevent damage following a Maze ransomware attack.

On May 27, 2026, X-FAB's stock experienced significant volatility following a viral post on the social network X by an influential semiconductor-focused account, presenting the company as an investment opportunity related to photonics, artificial intelligence, and power semiconductors. The stock surged as much as 76% during the trading session before partially paring its gains, without any major official announcement from the company.

== Corporate affairs ==
The main shareholders of X-Fab Silicon Foundries are Xtrion NV (61.4%) and Sarawak Technology Holdings Sdn Bhd (35.2%). In 2017, X-Fab made an initial public offering (IPO) in France, where 36.2% of the shares were available for purchase. Meanwhile, Xtrion reduced its shareholdings to 48.3% and Sarawak Technology Holdings reduced its shares to 14.4%. Xtrion NV also holds majority shares in Melexis, where the latter is a major customer for X-Fab. Meanwhile, Sarawak Technology Holdings Sdn Bhd is a wholly owned subsidiary of the government of Sarawak. Both Xtrion and Sarawak Technology Holdings have the power to appoint two directors each onto the board of directors of X-Fab. X-Fab revenue reached US$512.9 million in 2016.

=== Production capabilities ===
As of 2017, X-Fab has six wafer plants around the world, with production capacity of 94,000 200-mm sized wafers, ranging from 800 nm process to 130 nm process:

- Erfurt, Germany - producing CMOS semiconductors and microelectromechanical systems (MEMS devices) from 200-mm wafers
- Dresden, Germany - producing CMOS semiconductors from 200-mm wafers
- Itzehoe, Germany - producing MEMS devices from 200-mm wafers
- Corbeil-Essonnes, France - producing 180-nm CMOS semiconductors
- Kuching, Sarawak, Malaysia - producing CMOS semiconductors from 200-mm wafers
- Lubbock, Texas, United States - producing CMOS and BiCMOS semiconductors from 150-mm wafers

X-Fab employs a total of 2,946 people in all its production facilities as of 2016.

X-fab's chips are used in automotive, industrial, consumer, and medical industries. As of 2016, X-Fab's European/Middle East customers accounted for 54% of the sales, followed by Asia (36%) and North America (10%). The biggest buyer of X-Fab's chips is Melexis (34%). Other buyers of X-Fab chips are: Goodix, Lite-On, Micronas, Sensata, Integrated Device Technology, Knowles Electronics, and others. Russian buyers for X-Fab chips were: CJSC PKK Milander, KTTS "Electronics", VZPP-S, VZPP-Mikron, and OJSC NII Electronic Engineering (NIIET).

In 2022 X-Fab licensed a 130 nm siGe BiCMOS platform from the Leibniz Institute for High Performance Microelectronics(IHP). Beforehand, X-Fabs products were already being used in IHPs SG13S and SG13G2 chips.

In 2023, X-Fab announced a $1 billion investment to increase production capacity at its factories in Europe, the United States, and Malaysia.

== See also ==
- Pure-Play Semiconductor Foundry
- List of semiconductor fabrication plants
- List of semiconductor companies by country
