= Epistar =

LED lighting manufacturer based in Taiwan

Ennostar Corporation
- Industry: LED lights
- Founded: 1996
- Headquarters: Hsinchu, Taiwan
- Products: LED light products
- Number of employees: 871
- Parent: Ennostar Inc.
- Subsidiaries: EPISTAR, Unikorn Semiconductor, Yenrich Technology Corporation, Prolight Opto
- Website: chip.ennostar.com

Epistar Corp. (晶元光電股份有限公司), now renamed as Ennostar Corporation (富采光電), is the largest manufacturer of light-emitting diodes (LEDs) in Taiwan. Epistar Corp. was established in 1996, and its headquarters are in Hsinchu. In 2009 it had an annual turnover of NT$10 billion. Ennostar Corporation specializes in high-brightness LED products, which are used in general lighting, traffic signals, and various consumer products such as mobile phones and laptop computers. The company supplies the LED backlighting for global leading LCD makers.

== History ==
Founding and spin-offs (1996-2017)

The company was established in 1996, and its headquarters are in Hsinchu. In 2005, Epistar absorbed the company United Epitaxy Company (UEC), also an LED maker. The new company remained named Epistar. The merger took place in December. In July 2005, Epistar's sales were NT$246 million. Epistar's first president, Bling-Jye Lee, later became chairman, and in 2008, Ming-Jiunn Jou became president. It has a history of patent disputes with competitor Philips Lumileds, now Lumileds, over the use of AlInGaP LED technology. However, in September, 2009, Philips Lumileds signed an agreement to license AlInGaP technology to Epistar. Epistar was the world's largest manufacturer of red and yellow LED in 2009, and held over 3000 patents. In 2009 it had an annual turnover of NT$10 billion. Epistar acquired Huga Optotech in December 2012, with Huga becoming a fully owned LED chip unit of Epistar, and then delisting from the local stock market. Previously, Epistar had owned 48% of the company.

Recent developments (2018-2022)

The company spun off Jingcheng Semiconductor, its foundry subsidiary, on October 1, 2018. At the time, Epistar Corp was still focused on LED epitaxial wafer and chip manufacturing. Epistar allocated the company an enterprise value of $32.8 million. M.J. Chou stepped down in July 2016 as Epistar president to take over as president of the new company, but kept his seat on the Epistar board. He was replaced by Patrick Fan.

It was announced in 2021 that Unikorn Semiconductor had been outsourced to produce Epistar's microLED panels.

In 2022, Epistar sued Amazon for allegedly infringing on 12 LED patents related to Fire TVs. The suit, in Texas federal court, alleged some models of the Fire TV lineup contained LED chips that infringed on Epistar's patents. In 2021, Epistar was expected to become a supplier of mini-microLED chips for Samsung. In 2022, the company stated it would be expanding mini LED chip production capacity in China from 1.2 to 1.5 million units per year. In May 2022, Ennostar subsidiaries included EPISTAR, Lextar Electronics, Unikorn Semiconductor, Yenrich Technology Corporation, and Prolight Opto.

== Facilities ==
Among other facilities, in 2020, Epistar announced it would invest in a production line at the Central Taiwan Science Park. It also has production at Hsinchu Science Park, where it was seeking to expand capacity in 2020 as part of a US$179.28 million investment on production, and well as development for new uses of mini, micro, ultraviolet, and infrared LEDs. It also said it would set up a new room at the Southern Taiwan Science Park. In Hsinchu Science Park, it was reported in 2020 that Apple was investing around $334 million in a factory in conjunction with both Epistar and AU Optronics, with the factory to be owned by Hsinchu Science Park.

== Products ==
Ennostar Corporation specializes in high-brightness LED products, which are used in general lighting, traffic signals, and various consumer products such as mobile phones and laptop computers. The company supplies the LED backlighting for global leading LCD makers.

== See also ==
- List of companies of Taiwan
