= Sanan Optoelectronics =

Chinese LED company

Sanan Optoelectronics Co. Ltd.
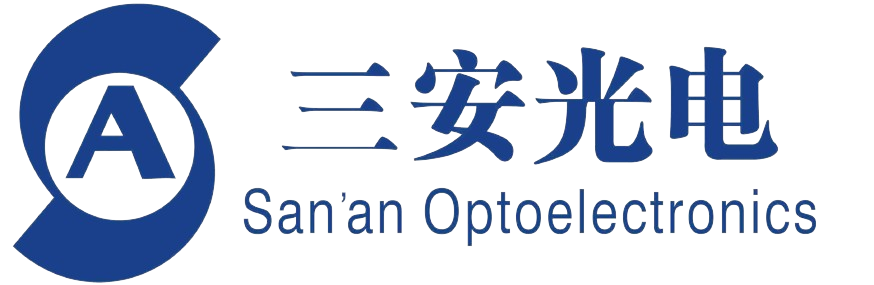
- Native name: 三安光电股份有限公司
- Type: Public
- Traded as: SSE: 600703; China Mainland All
- Industry: Semiconductors
- Founded: 12 November 2000; 25 years ago
- Founder: Lin Xiucheng
- Headquarters: Xiamen, Fujian, China
- Key people: Lin Zhiqiang (Chairman); Lin Kechuang (CEO)
- Revenue: ▲CN¥14.05 billion (2023)
- Net income: ▼CN¥366.56 million (2023)
- Total assets: ▼CN¥57.68 billion (2023)
- Total equity: ▲CN¥38.30 billion (2023)
- Number of employees: 15,439 (2023)
- Website: www.sanan-e.com

Sanan Optoelectronics (Sanan; Chinese: 三安光电; pinyin: Sānān Guāngdiàn) is a publicly listed Chinese company that engages in full-color high-brightness light-emitting diode (LED) wafer and chip manufacturing. It also manufactures solar cell and PIN photodetectors.

== Background ==
Lin Xiucheng was an employee of Sanming Iron and Steel Mill, the largest integrated steel producer in Fujian province. In October 1992, Lin and Sanming established Sanan Steel in Anxi which Lin served as chairman and CEO. Sanan Steel was the processor of Sanan Group which would serve as the holding company for Lin and his family.

In October 1999, Lin attended a Hi-tech Fair in Shenzhen where he came into contact with LEDs for the first time. Lin saw potential in the industry and travelled to the United States to recruit talent.

In 2000, Sanan Group, a branch of the Ministry of Industry and Information Technology and Xiamen SASAC signed a joint venture contract for the establishment of Sanan Electronics.

Gradually Sanan Group acquired most of Sanan Electronics' shares. In 2004, Sanan Group moved its headquarters to Xiamen. In February 2004, Lin's son-in-law Lin Kechuang was appointed as the CEO of Sanan Electronics.

In July 2007, Sanan Electronics planned to become a publicly listed company via backdoor listing by acquiring listed company, Tianyi Science & Technology. In June 2008, the asset restructuring was completed where Sanan Electronics held 46.69% of shares and Sanan Group held shares of 22.06%. On 14 July 2008, Tianyi Science & Technology shares were renamed to Sanan Optoelectronics and the backdoor listing was completed.

In March 2016, Sanan was in discussion with Taiwanese semiconductor firm GCS Holdings to acquire it for US$226 million. However, in August 2016, the transaction was blocked by the Committee on Foreign Investment in the United States. Instead a memorandum of understanding was signed to form a new joint venture, with the aim of building a 6-inch wafer plant.

In October 2016, Sanan announced it was in talks to acquire Osram for US$8.2 billion. However, by December 2016, Sanan dropped its plans after witnessing political opposition to the acquisition of Aixtron by Fujian Grand Chip Investment Fund. Sanan had previously cancelled purchase orders for Aixtron in December 2015 causing Aixtron's stock price to drop 43%.

On 10 April 2019, Sanan was added to the Bureau of Industry and Security Unverified List. On 27 June 2019, Sanan was removed from the list leading its shares to surge by 10%.

In December 2019, Sanan acquired Wipac from its parent, Carclo for £10.5 million.

For China's top 10 chip subsidy recipients in 2022, Sanan came second receiving 1.03 billion yuan in subsidies.

In June 2023, Sanan and STMicroelectronics announces they signed an agreement to create a new 200-mm silicon carbide device manufacturing joint venture in Chongqing. The cost of the project would be US$3.2 billion and is expected to begin production in the fourth quarter of 2025, with full buildout anticipated in 2028.

In April 2024, Sanan became a supplier for Apple. In May 2024, it was reported that Sanan was accelerating its plans to expand overseas. Sanan also announced its joint venture with STMicroelectronics would likely launch the production line by the end of 2024.

== See also ==
- Semiconductor industry in China
