= Seoul Semiconductor =

South Korean company

Seoul Semiconductor Co., Ltd.
- Company type: Public; KOSDAQ:046890
- Industry: Electronics
- Founded: 1992; 34 years ago
- Headquarters: Ansan, Gyeonggi Province, South Korea
- Key people: Chung Hoon Lee (CEO)
- Products: Light-emitting diodes
- Revenue: KRW 953,800,000,000 (December 2016)
- Website: www.seoulsemicon.com

Seoul Semiconductor develops and commercializes light-emitting diodes (LEDs) for automotive, general illumination, specialty lighting, and backlighting markets. It is the fourth-largest LED manufacturer globally.
