= Foundry model =

Microelectronics business model

The foundry model is a microelectronics engineering and manufacturing business model consisting of a semiconductor fabrication plant, or foundry, and an integrated circuit design operation, each belonging to separate companies or subsidiaries. It was first conceived by Morris Chang, the founder of the Taiwan Semiconductor Manufacturing Company Limited (TSMC).

Integrated device manufacturers (IDMs) design and manufacture integrated circuits. Many companies, known as fabless semiconductor companies, only design devices; merchant or pure play foundries only manufacture devices for other companies, without designing them. Examples of IDMs are Intel, Samsung, and Texas Instruments, examples of pure play foundries are GlobalFoundries, TSMC, and UMC, and examples of fabless companies are AMD, Nvidia, and Qualcomm.

Integrated circuit production facilities are expensive to build and maintain. Unless they can be kept at nearly full use, they will become a drain on the finances of the company that owns them. The foundry model uses two methods to avoid these costs: fabless companies avoid costs by not owning such facilities. Merchant foundries, on the other hand, find work from the worldwide pool of fabless companies, through careful scheduling, pricing, and contracting, keep their plants in full use.

== History ==
Companies that both designed and produced the devices were originally responsible for manufacturing microelectronic devices. These manufacturers were involved in both the research and development of manufacturing processes and the research and development of microcircuit design.

The first pure play semiconductor company is the Taiwan Semiconductor Manufacturing Corporation founded by Morris Chang, a spin-off of the government Industrial Technology Research Institute, which split its design and fabrication divisions in 1987, a model advocated for by Carver Mead in the U.S., but deemed too costly to pursue. The separation of design and fabrication became known as the foundry model, with fabless manufacturing outsourcing to semiconductor foundries.

Fabless semiconductor companies do not have any semiconductor fabrication capability, instead contracting with a merchant foundry for fabrication. The fabless company concentrates on the research and development of an IC-product; the foundry concentrates on manufacturing and testing the physical product. If the foundry does not have any semiconductor design capability, it is a pure-play semiconductor foundry.

An absolute separation into fabless and foundry companies is not necessary. Many companies continue to exist that perform both operations and benefit from the close coupling of their skills. Some companies manufacture some of their own designs and contract out to have others manufactured or designed, in cases where they see value or seek special skills. The foundry model is a business model that seeks to optimize productivity.

=== MOSIS ===
The very first merchant foundries were part of the MOSIS service. The MOSIS service gave limited production access to designers with limited means, such as students, university researchers, and engineers at small startups. The designer submitted designs, and these submissions were manufactured with the commercial company's extra capacity. Manufacturers could insert some wafers for a MOSIS design into a collection of their own wafers when a processing step was compatible with both operations. The commercial company (serving as foundry) was already running the process, so they were effectively being paid by MOSIS for something they were already doing. A factory with excess capacity during slow periods could also run MOSIS designs to avoid having expensive capital equipment stand idle.

Under-use of an expensive manufacturing plant could lead to the financial ruin of the owner, so selling surplus wafer capacity was a way to maximize the fab's use. Hence, economic factors created a climate where fab operators wanted to sell surplus wafer-manufacturing capacity and designers wanted to purchase manufacturing capacity rather than try to build it.

Although MOSIS opened the doors to some fabless customers, earning additional revenue for the foundry and providing inexpensive service to the customer, running a business around MOSIS production was difficult. The merchant foundries sold wafer capacity on a surplus basis, as a secondary business activity. Services to the customers were secondary to the commercial business, with little guarantee of support. The choice of merchant dictated the design, development flow, and available techniques to the fabless customer. Merchant foundries might require proprietary and non-portable preparation steps. Foundries concerned with protecting what they considered trade secrets of their methodologies might only be willing to release data to designers after an onerous nondisclosure procedure.

=== Dedicated foundry ===
In 1987, the world's first dedicated merchant foundry opened its doors: Taiwan Semiconductor Manufacturing Company (TSMC). The distinction of 'dedicated' is in reference to the typical merchant foundry of the era, whose primary business activity was building and selling of its own IC-products. The dedicated foundry offers several key advantages to its customers: first, it does not sell finished IC-products into the supply channel; thus a dedicated foundry will never compete directly with its fabless customers (obviating a common concern of fabless companies). Second, the dedicated foundry can scale production capacity to a customer's needs, offering low-quantity shuttle services in addition to full-scale production lines. Finally, the dedicated foundry offers a "COT-flow" (customer owned tooling) based on industry-standard EDA systems, whereas many IDM merchants required its customers to use proprietary (non-portable) development tools. The COT advantage gave the customer complete control over the design process, from concept to final design.

== Foundry sales leaders by year ==
- Pure-play semiconductor foundry is a company that does not offer a significant amount of IC products of its own design, but instead operates semiconductor fabrication plants focused on producing ICs for other companies.
- Integrated device manufacturer (IDM) semiconductor foundry is where companies such as Texas Instruments, IBM, and Samsung join in to provide foundry services as long as there is no conflict of interest between relevant parties.

=== 2023 ===
As of 2023, the top semiconductor foundries were:
Rank	Company	Foundry type	Country/Territory of origin	Revenue (million USD)	
2023	Company	Foundry type	Country/Territory of origin	Q4 2023	Q3 2023
1	TSMC	Pure-play	Taiwan	19,660	17,249
2	Samsung Semiconductor	IDM	Korea	3,619	3,690
3	GlobalFoundries	Pure-play	United States	1,854	1,852
4	UMC	Pure-play	Taiwan	1,727	1,801
5	SMIC	Pure-play	China	1,678	1,620
6	Hua Hong Semiconductor	Pure-play	China	657	766
7	Tower Semiconductor	Pure-play	Israel	352	358
8	PowerChip	IDM	Taiwan	330	305
9	Nexchip	Pure-play	China	308	283
10	Vanguard (VIS)	Pure-play	Taiwan	304	333

=== 2017 ===
As of 2017, the top semiconductor foundries were:
Rank	Company	Foundry type	Country/Territory of origin	Revenue (million USD)	
2017	Company	Foundry type	Country/Territory of origin	2017	2016
1	TSMC	Pure-play	Taiwan	32,040	29,437
2	GlobalFoundries	Pure-play	United States	5,407	4,999
3	UMC	Pure-play	Taiwan	4,898	4,587
4	Samsung Semiconductor	IDM	Korea	7,398	4,284
5	SMIC	Pure-play	China	3,099	2,914
6	TowerJazz	Pure-play	Israel	1,388	1,249
7	PowerChip	IDM	Taiwan	1,035	870
8	Vanguard (VIS)	Pure-play	Taiwan	817	801
9	Hua Hong Semiconductor	Pure-play	China	807	721
10	Dongbu HiTek	Pure-play	Korea	676	666

=== 2016–2014 ===
As of 2016, the top pure-play semiconductor foundries were:
Rank		Company	Foundry type	Country/Territory of origin	Revenue (million USD)		
2016	2015	Company	Foundry type	Country/Territory of origin	2016	2015	2014
1	1	TSMC	Pure-play	Taiwan	29,488	25,574	25,138
2	2	GlobalFoundries	Pure-play	United States	5,545	5,019	4,355
3	3	UMC	Pure-play	Taiwan	4,582	4,464	4,331
4	4	SMIC	Pure-play	China	2,921	2,236	1,970
5	5	PowerChip	Pure-play	Taiwan	1,275	1,268	1,291
6	6	TowerJazz	Pure-play	Israel	1,249	961	828
8	8	Vanguard (VIS)	Pure-play	Taiwan	800	736	790
9	9	Hua Hong Semi	Pure-play	China	712	650	665
10	10	Dongbu HiTek	Pure-play	Korea	672	593	541
11	12	X-Fab	Pure-play	Germany	510	331	330
		Others	Pure-play		2,251	2,405	2,280

=== 2013 ===
As of 2013, the top 13 semiconductor foundries were:
2013 Rank	2012 Rank	Company	Foundry Type	Country/Territory of origin	Revenue (million $USD)
1	1	TSMC	Pure-play	Taiwan	19,850
2	2	GlobalFoundries	Pure-play	United States	4,261
3	3	UMC	Pure-play	Taiwan	3,959
4	4	Samsung Semiconductor	IDM	Korea	3,950
5	5	SMIC	Pure-play	China	1,973
7	8	PowerChip	Pure-play	Taiwan	1,175
8	9	Vanguard (VIS)	Pure-play	Taiwan	713
9	6	Huahong Grace	Pure-play	China	710
10	10	Dongbu	Pure-play	Korea	570
11	7	TowerJazz	Pure-play	Israel	509
12	11	IBM	IDM	United States	485
13	12	MagnaChip	IDM	Korea	411
14	13	Win Semiconductors	Pure-play	Taiwan	354

=== 2011 ===
As of 2011, the top 14 semiconductor foundries were:
Rank	Company	Foundry type	Country/Territory of origin	Revenue (million USD)
1	TSMC	Pure-play	Taiwan	14,600
2	UMC	Pure-play	Taiwan	3,760
3	GlobalFoundries	Pure-play	United States	3,580
4	Samsung Semiconductor	IDM	Korea	1,975
5	SMIC	Pure-play	China	1,315
6	TowerJazz	Pure-play	Israel	610
7	Vanguard (VIS)	Pure-play	Taiwan	519
8	Dongbu HiTek	Pure-play	Korea	500
9	IBM	IDM	United States	445
10	MagnaChip	IDM	Korea	350
11	SSMC	Pure-play	Singapore	345
12	Hua Hong NEC	Pure-play	China	335
13	Win Semiconductors	Pure-play	Taiwan	300
14	X-Fab	Pure-play	Germany	285

=== 2010 ===
As of 2010, the top 10 semiconductor foundries were:
Rank	Company	Foundry Type	Country/Territory of origin	Revenue (million USD)
1	TSMC	Pure-play	Taiwan	13,332
2	UMC	Pure-play	Taiwan	3,824
3	GlobalFoundries	Pure-play	United States	3,520
4	SMIC	Pure-play	China	1,554
5	Dongbu HiTek	Pure-play	Korea	512
6	TowerJazz	Pure-play	Israel	509
7	Vanguard (VIS)	Pure-play	Taiwan	505
8	IBM	IDM	United States	500
9	MagnaChip	IDM	Korea	410
10	Samsung Semiconductor	IDM	Korea	390

=== 2009–2007 ===
As of 2009, the top 17 semiconductor foundries were:

Rank	Company	Foundry type	Country/Territory of origin	Revenue (million USD)		
2009	Company	Foundry type	Country/Territory of origin	2009	2008	2007
1	TSMC	Pure-play	Taiwan	8,989	10,556	9,813
2	UMC	Pure-play	Taiwan	2,815	3,070	3,430
3	Chartered(1)	Pure-play	Singapore	1,540	1,743	1,458
4	GlobalFoundries	Pure-play	USA	1,101	0	0
5	SMIC	Pure-play	China	1,075	1,353	1,550
6	Dongbu	Pure-play	South Korea	395	490	510
7	Vanguard	Pure-play	Taiwan	382	511	486
8	IBM	IDM	USA	335	400	570
9	Samsung	IDM	South Korea	325	370	355
10	Grace	Pure-play	China	310	335	310
11	HeJian	Pure-play	China	305	345	330
12	Tower Semiconductor	Pure-play	Israel	292	252	231
13	HHNEC	Pure-play	China	290	350	335
14	SSMC	Pure-play	Singapore	280	340	359
15	Texas Instruments	IDM	USA	250	315	450
16	X-Fab	Pure-play	Germany	223	368	410
17	MagnaChip	IDM	South Korea	220	290	322

(1) Now acquired by GlobalFoundries

=== 2008–2006 ===
As of 2008, the top 18 pure-play semiconductor foundries were:

Rank	Company	Country/Territory of origin	Revenue (million USD)		
2008	Company	Country/Territory of origin	2008	2007	2006
1	TSMC	Taiwan	10,556	9,813	9,748
2	UMC	Taiwan	3,400	3,755	3,670
3	Chartered	Singapore	1,743	1,458	1,527
4	SMIC	China	1,354	1,550	1,465
5	Vanguard	Taiwan	511	486	398
6	Dongbu	South Korea	490	510	456
7	X-Fab	Germany	400	410	290
8	HHNEC	China	350	335	315
9	HeJian	China	345	330	290
10	SSMC	Singapore	340	350	325
11	Grace	China	335	310	227
12	Tower Semiconductor	Israel	252	231	187
13	Jazz Semiconductor	United States	190	182	213
14	Silterra	Malaysia	175	180	155
15	ASMC	China	149	155	170
16	Polar Semiconductor	Japan	110	105	95
17	Mosel-Vitelic	Taiwan	100	105	155
18	CR Micro (1)	China	-	143	114
Others			140	167	180
Total			20,980	20,575	19,940

(1) Merged with CR Logic in 2008, reclassified as an IDM foundry

=== 2007–2005 ===
As of 2007, the top 14 semiconductor foundries include:

Rank	Company	Foundry type	Country/Territory of origin	Revenue (million USD)		
2007	Company	Foundry type	Country/Territory of origin	2007	2006	2005
1	TSMC	Pure-Play	Taiwan	9,813	9,748	8,217
2	UMC	Pure-Play	Taiwan	3,755	3,670	3,259
3	SMIC	Pure-Play	China	1,550	1,465	1,171
4	Chartered	Pure-Play	Singapore	1,458	1,527	1,132
5	Texas Instruments	IDM	United States	610	585	540
6	IBM	IDM	United States	570	600	665
7	Dongbu	Pure-Play	South Korea	510	456	347
8	Vanguard	Pure-Play	Taiwan	486	398	353
9	X-Fab	Pure-Play	Germany	410	290	202
10	Samsung	IDM	South Korea	385	75	-
11	SSMC	Pure-Play	Singapore	350	325	280
12	HHNEC	Pure-Play	China	335	315	313
13	HeJian	Pure-Play	China	330	290	250
14	MagnaChip	IDM	South Korea	322	342	345

For ranking in worldwide:

Rank		Company	Country/Territory of origin	Revenue (million USD)		2006/2005 changes
2006	2005	Company	Country/Territory of origin	2006	2005	2006/2005 changes
6	7	TSMC	Taiwan	9,748	8,217	+19%
21	22	UMC	Taiwan	3,670	3,259	+13%

=== 2004 ===
As of 2004, the top 10 pure-play semiconductor foundries were:

Rank 2004	Company	Country/Territory of origin
1	TSMC	Taiwan
2	UMC	Taiwan
3	Chartered	Singapore
4	SMIC	China
5	Dongbu/Anam	South Korea
6	SSMC	Singapore
7	HHNEC	China
8	Jazz Semiconductor	United States
9	Silterra	Malaysia
10	X-Fab	Germany

== Financial and IP issues ==
The cost to stay on the leading edge has steadily increased with each generation of chips. The financial strain is being felt by both large merchant foundries and their fabless customers. The cost of a new foundry exceeds $1 billion. Many merchant foundries have entered into joint ventures with their competitors in an effort to split research and design expenditures and fab-maintenance expenses.

Chip design companies sometimes avoid other companies' patents simply by purchasing the products from a licensed foundry with broad cross-license agreements with the patent owner.

Stolen design data is also a concern; data is rarely directly copied, because blatant copies are easily identified by distinctive features in the chip, placed there either for this purpose or as a byproduct of the design process. However, the data including any procedure, process system, method of operation or concept may be sold to a competitor, who may save months or years of tedious reverse engineering.

== See also ==
- Fabless manufacturing
- Contract manufacturer
- Integrated device manufacturer
- Semiconductor fabrication
- Original design manufacturer
- Original equipment manufacturer
- Semiconductor fabless sales leaders by year
- Semiconductor equipment sales leaders by year
