= DB HiTek =

South Korean semiconductor company

DB HiTek Co., Ltd.
- Native name: 주식회사 디비하이텍
- Formerly: Dongbu HiTek
- Type: Public
- Traded as: KRX: 000990
- Industry: Semiconductors
- Founded: February 1, 1997; 29 years ago
- Headquarters: Bucheon, Gyeonggi-do, South Korea
- Key people: Ki Seog Cho, CEO
- Number of employees: 2000
- Parent: DB Group
- Website: www.dbhitek.com

DB HiTek Co., Ltd. (Korean: 주식회사 디비하이텍), formerly Dongbu HiTek, is a semiconductor contract manufacturing and design company headquartered in Bucheon, Gyeonggi-do, South Korea. DB HiTek is one of the major contract chip manufacturers, alongside TSMC, Samsung Electronics, GlobalFoundries, and UMC. It is also the second-largest foundry company in South Korea, behind Samsung Electronics.

== History ==
Dongbu Electronics was founded as a memory chipmaker in 1997, but later was transformed into a foundry company in 2001. Dongbu Electronics acquired Anam Semiconductor's foundry operation from Amkor Technology for 114 billion South Korean Won (US$ 93 million) in 2002.

Dongbu HiTek was established in 2007 as a result of the merger between Dongbu Electronics and Dongbu Hannong Chemical, both of which are subsidiaries of Dongbu Group. Dongbu HiTek changed its company name to DB HiTek when Dongbu Group was renamed DB Group in 2017.

== See also ==
- List of semiconductor fabrication plants
- Foundry model
- Semiconductor fabrication plant
