= Shu Li =

Chinese-American corporate executive

- Born: Beijing, China
- Citizenship: United States
- Education: Huazhong University of Science and Technology (BS); University of Illinois Urbana-Champaign (MS); Harvard University (PhD)
- Occupations: Corporate executive, engineer
- Years active: 1980s–present
- Known for: Co-founding Jazz Semiconductor and Cellular Biomedicine Group
- Title: President and CEO of Jazz Semiconductor; Executive Chairman of Helio Genomics

Shu Li is a Chinese-American corporate executive and engineer. He has co-founded several companies in the semiconductor and biotechnology sectors, including Jazz Semiconductor, Cellular Biomedicine Group, and Helio Genomics.

Prior to his entrepreneurial work, Li held management and executive positions at Intel, Motorola, AlliedSignal (later Honeywell), and Conexant Systems. He is a member of the Committee of 100.

== Early life and education ==
Li was born in Beijing, China, to parents who were geologists and faculty members at the China University of Geosciences. During the Cultural Revolution, his family's assets were seized by the state, and Li was sent with his mother and sister to a labor camp in Jiangxi, where they lived for six years from age 9 to 15.

After returning to Beijing at age 15, Li completed his secondary education and entered the Huazhong University of Science and Technology, graduating with a Bachelor of Science in electrical engineering. He subsequently immigrated to the United States for graduate study, earning a Master of Science in Electrical and computer sciences from the University of Illinois Urbana-Champaign and a PhD in applied sciences from Harvard University. His doctoral research focused on the application of generalized Markov chains to search optimization. He later obtained an additional degree from American Liberty University.

== Career ==
=== Corporate management ===
Li began his career as an assistant professor of systems engineering at the University of Arizona in Tucson, Arizona. He transitioned to the private sector by joining Intel as an operations manager, where at age 29 he was appointed to manage operations at its Fab6 semiconductor manufacturing facility in Arizona. He was later employed by Motorola in Phoenix, directing research and development operations focused on microchips utilized in consumer electronics and telecommunications infrastructure.

Li subsequently joined AlliedSignal (which later merged into Honeywell), where he spent six years holding various executive positions within its aerospace and aviation business units. His roles included Vice President of Engineering for the Aerospace Sector, Vice President of Operations, and Vice President and General Manager of Commercial Spares.

=== Semiconductor and biotechnology ventures ===
In 2000, Li joined Conexant Systems, a former division of Rockwell International, serving as Senior Vice President. In 2002, he secured private equity financing from the Carlyle Group to spin off Conexant's manufacturing facility in Newport Beach, California, into an independent specialty semiconductor foundry named Jazz Semiconductor, serving as its president and chief executive officer. In 2007, Jazz Semiconductor was acquired for $260 million by Acquicor Technology, a special-purpose acquisition company led by Steve Wozniak and Gil Amelio. Li resigned from the company following the merger in June 2007.

Following his career in the semiconductor industry, Li established an investment firm, J&J Investments, to focus on healthcare, biopharmaceuticals, and clinical diagnostics startups.

- Cellular Biomedicine Group (CBMG): Co-founded by Li in 2009, this biopharmaceutical firm focused on developing immunotherapies, including CAR-T cell therapy, and stem cell therapeutics. The company merged into EastBridge Investment Group and subsequently listed on the NASDAQ exchange under the ticker symbol CBMG in 2014.
- WA Health Center International / iKang: Li founded WA Health Center International, a clinical services network operating medical centers in Shanghai and Beijing, which merged with the NASDAQ-listed iKang Healthcare Group in 2015.
- Helio Genomics: In 2016, Li founded Helio Genomics (initially organized as the Laboratory for Advanced Medicine & Health) to commercialize epigenetic research and develop blood-based DNA methylation tests for early cancer detection, utilizing licensed research from the University of California, San Diego. He serves as the Executive Chairman of the company's board.

== Affiliations and philanthropy ==
Li serves on the Executive Advisory Board for the Paul Merage School of Business Administration at the University of California, Irvine. He has also acted as an institutional advisor to the chancellors of UC Irvine and the University of California, Los Angeles (UCLA).

In philanthropy, he established the Beyond Longevity foundation, a non-profit organization that provides funding for peer-reviewed scientific research into biological aging, and has co-authored books on anti-aging medicine.
