= United Microelectronics Corporation =

Taiwanese semiconductor foundry

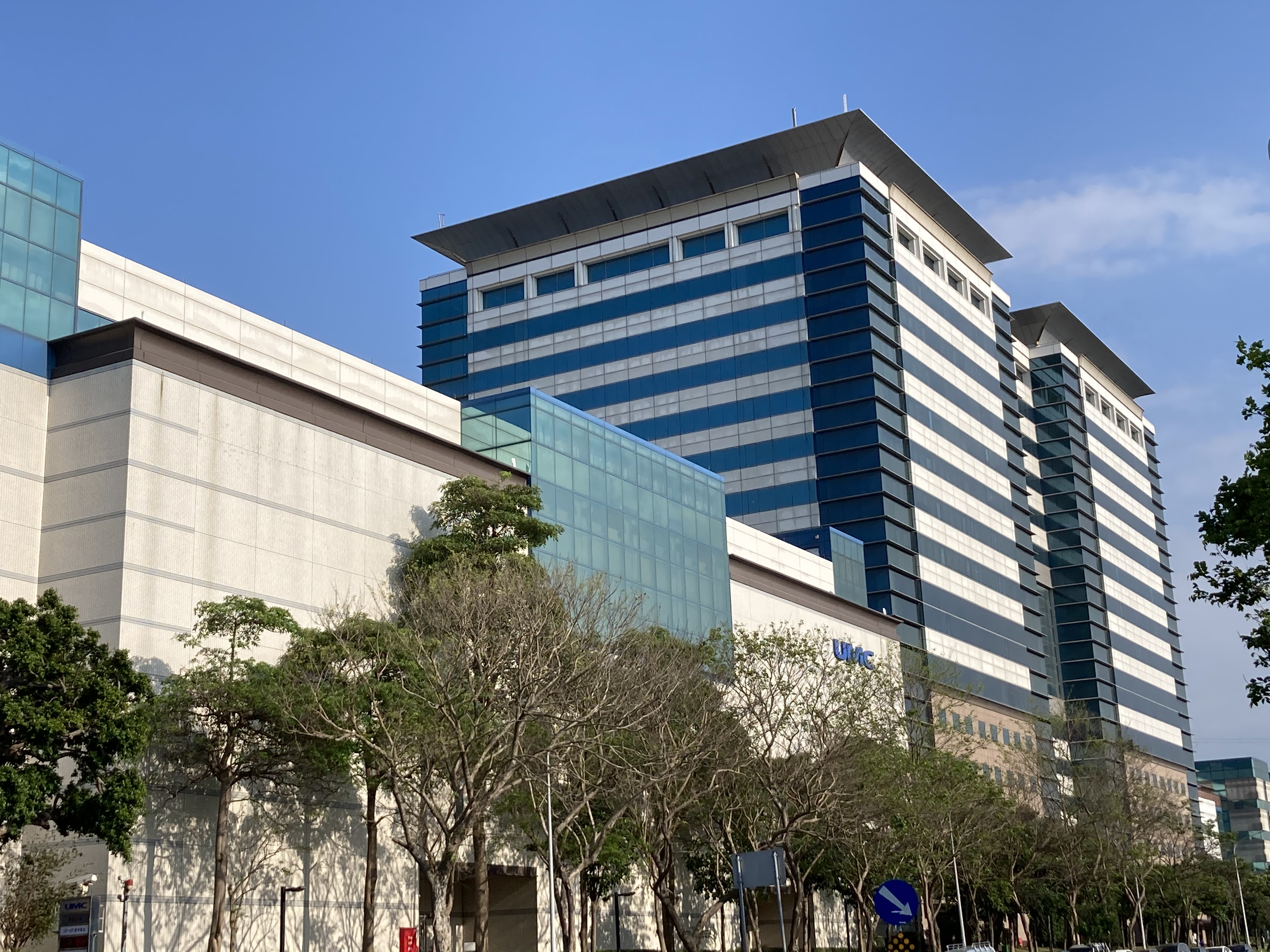
- Native name: 聯華電子
- Type: Public
- Traded as: TWSE: 2303; NYSE: UMC
- Industry: Semiconductor Foundry
- Founded: 1980; 46 years ago
- Founder: Robert Tsao
- Headquarters: Hsinchu Science Park; Hsinchu, Taiwan
- Key people: Stan Hung (Chairman); Jason Wang (CEO); Ming Hsu (President and COO)
- Revenue: ▲US$7.565 billion (2025)
- Operating income: ▼US$1.40 billion (2025)
- Net income: ▲US$1.329 billion (2025)
- Number of employees: 20,000 (2025)
- Website: umc.com

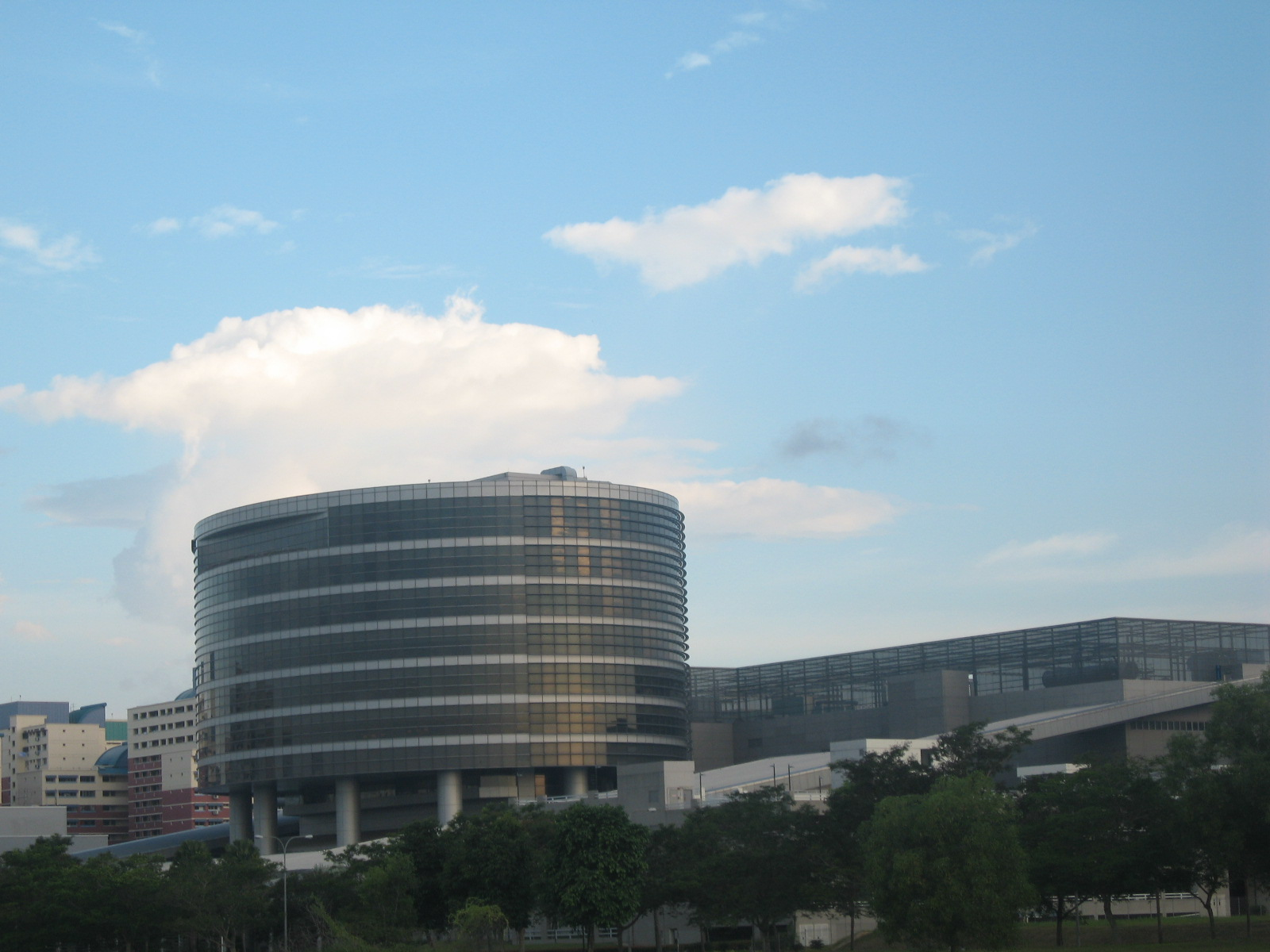
The Singapore factory and offices of United Microelectronics Corporation

United Microelectronics Corporation (UMC; Chinese: 聯華電子; pinyin: Liánhuá Diànzǐ) is a Taiwanese company based in Hsinchu, Taiwan. It was founded as Taiwan's first semiconductor company in 1980 as a spin-off of the government-sponsored Industrial Technology Research Institute (ITRI).

== Overview ==
UMC is best known for its semiconductor foundry business, manufacturing integrated circuits wafers for fabless semiconductor companies. In this role, UMC is ranked behind competitor TSMC. It has four 300 mm fabs, one in Taiwan, one in Singapore, one in China, and one in Japan.

UMC has 12 manufacturing facilities worldwide, employing approximately 19,500 people.

UMC is a significant supplier to the automotive industry.

== History ==
- On May 22, 1980, UMC was spun off from the Industrial Technology Research Institute and was formally established as the first private integrated circuit company in Taiwan.
- 1983: TMC starts a joint research project with US-based Vitelic.
- 1985
  - UMC was officially listed on the Taiwan Stock Exchange (code: 2303). It was the first listed semiconductor company in Taiwan. At that time, Morris Chang was its chairman.
  - UMC sets up a subsidiary, Unicorn Microelectronics Corporation (also abbreviated UMC), in Silicon Valley to improve access to technology, signing joint research agreements with Mosel (later Mosel Vitelic) and Quasel.
- 1995: UMC decided to transform from an IDM company with its own products to a professional pure-play foundry.
- 1996: Spun off its IC design units to establish MediaTek, Novatek, ITE Technology, Faraday Technology, AMIC Technology, and Davicom.
- 1999: Fab 12A 12-inch wafer fab in Tainan Science Park was officially established.
- 2000:
  - Listed on the New York Stock Exchange (code: UMC) as Taiwan's second semiconductor company to do so.
  - Produces the first chips using copper process technology and the first 0.13 micron ICs in the semiconductor industry.
- 2004: 12-inch wafer fab in Singapore enters mass production.
- 2013: Fully acquires "Hejian Technology Wafer Fab" in Suzhou, China.
- 2015: USCXM 12-inch wafer fab located in Xiamen, Fujian Province, China was officially established.
- 2017: 28 nm mass production begins at USCXM in Xiamen, China.
- July 2017: UMC invested US$611 million to expand its Xiamen factory.
- 2019: Fully acquired Japan-based Mie Fujitsu Semiconductor.
- 2020: Reached a plea agreement with the U.S. Department of Justice to resolve a 2018 trade secrets case.
- 2021: Joins RE100 and pledges net zero emissions by 2025.
- 2021: UMC and Micron announced globally to withdraw their complaints against the other party, and the companies look forward to engaging in mutual business cooperation opportunities.

=== U.S. Indictment and guilty plea ===
The United States Department of Justice indicted UMC and Chinese firm Fujian Jinhua in 2018, alleging that they conspired to steal intellectual property from U.S. company Micron. In October 2020, UMC and the U.S. Department of Justice reached a plea agreement, with UMC pleading guilty to one count of receiving and possessing a stolen trade secret and agreeing to pay a fine of $60 million. UMC's plea and Plea Agreement resolved the 2018 trade secrets case brought against UMC by the U.S. Department of Justice. As part of the Plea Agreement, DOJ agreed to dismiss the original indictment against UMC, including allegations of conspiracy to commit economic espionage and conspiracy to steal multiple trade secrets from Micron Technology, Inc. ("Micron"), patent-related allegations, and alleged damages and penalties of US$400 million to $8.75 billion. The one trade secret at issue in the guilty plea and Plea Agreement related to older technology that had been in mass production worldwide for several years. DOJ also dismissed a related civil case against UMC. Aside from the fine amount, UMC has no further financial obligations to DOJ. The Plea Agreement also provides that UMC will cooperate with DOJ and will be subject to a three-year term of non-supervised probation.

In November 2021, UMC and Micron agreed to withdraw complaints against each other globally following a years-long legal dispute over intellectual property rights (IP). UMC will make an undisclosed one-time payment to Micron Technology. Both parties also announced their intention to seek mutual business cooperation opportunities in the future.

In February 2024, US District Judge Maxine M. Chesney in San Francisco ruled that the US prosecutors failed to prove that Chinese firm, Fujian Jinhua had misappropriated trade secrets from Micron Technology Inc. Therefore, the Court found Jinhua not guilty.

== Fab list ==
Semiconductor fabrication plants (Note: The number (e.g. 8 or 12) in the fab name indicates the size of the wafer.)
| Foundry | Node | Location | Wafer diameter | Annual Wafer Capacity in 2025 |
|---|---|---|---|---|
| Wavetek (WTK) | 5000 – 150 nm | Hsinchu, Taiwan | 150 mm | 317,000 |
| Fab 8A | 3000 – 110 nm | Hsinchu, Taiwan | 200 mm | 857,000 |
| Fab 8C | 350 – 110 nm | Hsinchu, Taiwan | 200 mm | 500,000 |
| Fab 8D | 180 – 110 nm | Hsinchu, Taiwan | 200 mm | 471,000 |
| Fab 8E | 600 – 110 nm | Hsinchu, Taiwan | 200 mm | 522,000 |
| Fab 8F | 180 – 110 nm | Hsinchu, Taiwan | 200 mm | 583,000 |
| Fab 8S | 180 – 110 nm | Hsinchu, Taiwan | 200 mm | 466,000 |
| Fab 8N (Hejian Technology Corporation) | 500 – 110 nm | Suzhou, China | 200 mm | 996,000 |
| Fab 12A | 130 – 14 nm | Tainan, Taiwan | 300 mm | 1,629,000 |
| Fab 12i | 130 – 40 nm | Singapore | 300 mm | 684,000 |
| Fab 12X (United Semiconductor) | 80 – 22 nm | Xiamen, China | 300 mm | 347,000 |
| Fab 12M (USJC, former Fujitsu) | 130 – 40 nm | Kuwana, Japan | 300 mm | 471,000 |

== Processes ==
UMC focuses primarily on legacy and sub-28nm planar chips for processes such as data processing and communications, with some past and ongoing focus on nodes at or smaller than 14nm. Past focus on the 14nm node eventually gave way to a renewed business focus on existing lines in 2018 and has since ceased production. In 2024, Intel and UMC announced their collaboration on the development of a 12nm node aimed at mobile, communication infrastructure and networking, with a targeted 2027 start for production.

Annual Revenue breakdown by geometry
| Geometry | 2025 | 2024 | 2023 | 2022 | 2021 | 2020 | 2019 | 2018 | 2017 | 2016 |
|---|---|---|---|---|---|---|---|---|---|---|
| ≤14 nm | 0% | 0% | 0% | 0% | 0% | 0% | 0% | 3% | 1% | - |
| 14 nm < x ≤ 28 nm | 37% | 34% | 31% | 24% | 20% | 14% | 11% | 13% | 16% | 17% |
| 28 nm < x ≤ 40 nm | 16% | 14% | 14% | 18% | 18% | 23% | 23% | 25% | 28% | 27% |
| 40 nm < x ≤ 65 nm | 17% | 16% | 19% | 18% | 19% | 17% | 15% | 12% | 12% | 16% |
| 65 nm < x ≤ 90 nm | 8% | 11% | 10% | 8% | 8% | 11% | 14% | 8% | 5% | 4% |
| 90 nm < x ≤ 0.13 μm | 7% | 10% | 10% | 12% | 12% | 11% | 12% | 12% | 12% | 11% |
| 0.13 μm < x ≤ 0.18 μm | 10% | 10% | 9% | 11% | 13% | 13% | 13% | 14% | 12% | 12% |
| 0.18 μm < x ≤ 0.35 μm | 4% | 4% | 5% | 7% | 8% | 8% | 9% | 10% | 10% | 10% |
| ≥0.5 μm | 1% | 1% | 2% | 2% | 2% | 3% | 3% | 3% | 4% | 3% |

== Gallery ==
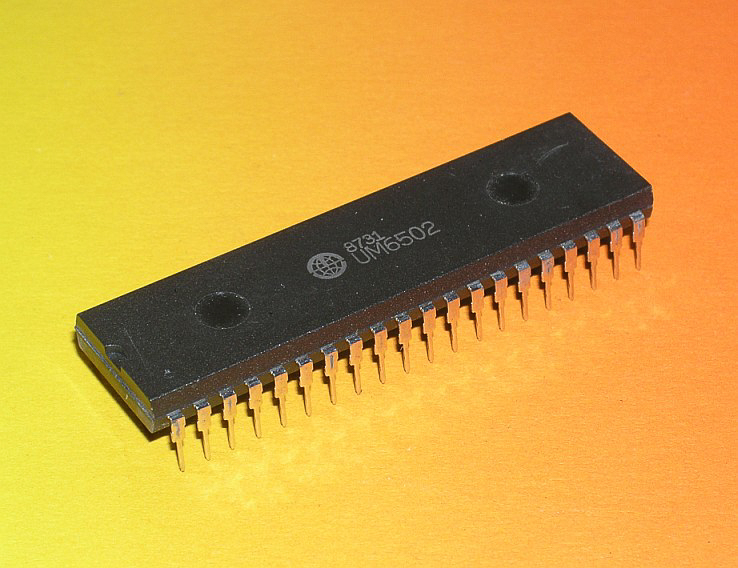
UM6502 a MOS Technology 6502 second source

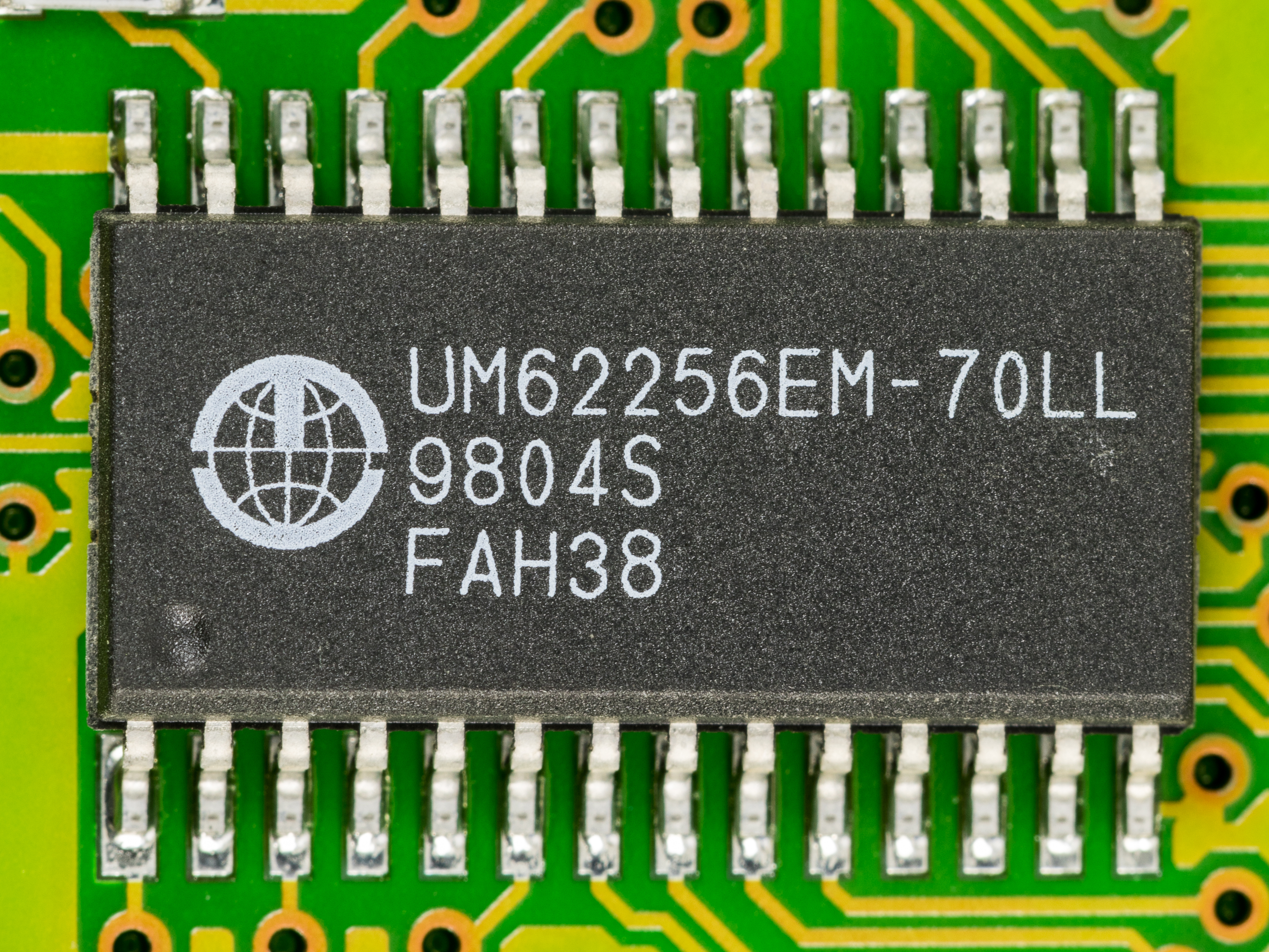
UMC UM62256EM-70LL - 32 kbit CMOS SRAM

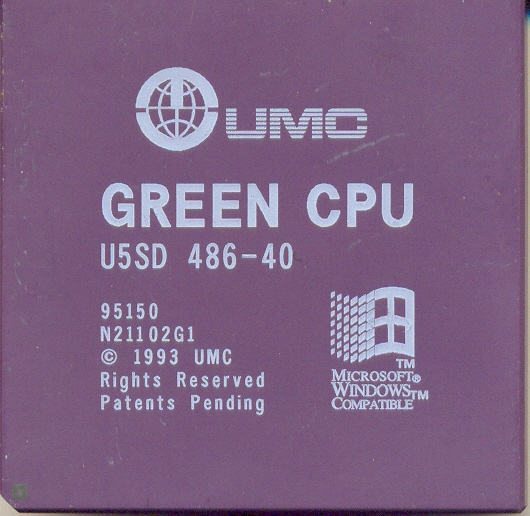
UMC Green CPU 40 MHz

== See also ==
- List of semiconductor fabrication plants
- List of companies of Taiwan
