= Jazz Semiconductor =

US-based semiconductor wafer foundry; subsidiary of Jazz Technologies, Inc.

- Logo in 2006 before acquisitions
- Type: Subsidiary
- Industry: Integrated circuit fabrication
- Founded: February 2002
- Parent: Tower Semiconductor

Jazz Semiconductor is a semiconductor wafer foundry that is a wholly owned United States subsidiary of Israel-based Tower Semiconductor. Its customers include developers of wireless, optical networking, power management, storage, and aerospace and defense applications. Headquartered in Newport Beach, California, Jazz passed through a number of acquisitions including the short-lived company Acquicor Technology, which renamed itself Jazz Technologies and then sold it two years later.

== History ==
Jazz Semiconductor Systems was founded on February 15, 2002, renamed itself Specialtysemi, Inc. later in February 2002 and to Jazz Semiconductor, Inc. in May 2002. Prior to March 12, 2002, it was Conexant's fabrication facility, as subsidiary Newport Fab, LLC. It was initially funded by Conexant and affiliates of the Carlyle Group. Shu Li was its chief executive since May 2002. RF Micro Devices invested $60 million in October 2002, and became a customer. Jazz reported losses for each year of 2003, 2004, and 2005. It filed for an attempted initial public offering (IPO) several times from January 2004 through July 2006, to be listed on Nasdaq under symbol JAZZ, but failed to attract investor interest.

Acquicor Management LLC was jointly formed by Gil Amelio, Steve Wozniak and Ellen Hancock, all of whom had worked for Apple Computer. Founded in August 2005, Amelio was Acquicor's chief executive. Acquicor Technology was known as a blank-check company: it existed only to make acquisitions in unspecified areas of the technology sector, with the management partnership as its only stock-holder. It filed for an IPO of its own in February 2006, expected to raise about $142 million adopting the symbol AQR on the American Stock Exchange. Although the company had to disclose that it had no revenues nor products, and companies previously led by its principals had failed, the celebrity status of the founders attracted attention. The demand for the March 14 IPO caused an exercise of the over-allotment, resulting in net proceeds of $164 million. One analyst said it was "faith-based investing taken to the extreme".

In September 2006, Acquicor announced it would acquire Jazz for $260 million in cash. Jazz withdrew its own registration statement. To help finance the acquisition, Acquicor raised $145 million from convertible notes on December 19, 2006 and another $21.75 million on December 22, 2006. Conexant made a $10 million equity investment in Jazz while waiting for the deal to close, which it did on February 16, 2007.

On February 21, 2007, Acquicor changed its name to Jazz Technologies, and its symbol to JAZ. In March 2007 Li resigned and Amelio became chief executive of the subsidiary company, still doing business as Jazz Semiconductor.

Jazz had specialized in analog-intensive mixed-signal integrated circuit manufacturing services. On June 11, 2007, it was announced that Hancock had left, and there were no plans to replace her. By the end of 2007, the company struggled to deal with the Great Recession and its debt burden, such as buying back shares from the Acquicor principals. In February 2008 it announced a loss, and shares had reduced in price by over 80% from its IPO. The company hinted it was seeking a buyer.

In May 2008, Jazz agreed to become a subsidiary of Tower Semiconductor of Israel in a stock-for-stock merger. The value of Jazz was only about $40 million after the assumption of debt, losing much of the original value of investors. Amelio retired as the deal closed on September 22, 2008.

== Jazz Technologies ==
Jazz Technologies is the parent company of its wholly owned subsidiary, Jazz Semiconductor, Inc.

On September 19, 2008, Tower Semiconductor, based in Israel, announced the completion of its merger with Jazz Technologies, Inc. As a result of this transaction, Amelio, Jazz’s chairman and chief executive officer, retired as an officer and director effective upon the closing of the merger.
