= Semiconductor consolidation =

Collaboration in the semiconductor industry

Semiconductor company logos

Semiconductor consolidation is the trend of semiconductor companies collaborating in order to come to a practical synergy with the goal of being able to operate in a business model that can sustain profitability.

== History ==
Since the rapid adoption of the modern day chip in the 1960s, most companies involved in producing semiconductors were extremely vertically integrated. Semiconductor companies owned and operated their own fabrication plants and also the processing technologies that facilitated the creation of the chips. Research, design, testing, production, and manufacturing were all kept "in house". Advances in the semiconductor industry made the market extremely competitive and companies began to use a technology roadmap that helped set goals for the industry. This roadmap came to be known as Moore's Law, a statistical trend seen by Intel's co-founder Gordon Moore in which the number of transistors on an integrated circuit is doubled approximately every 2 years. This increase in transistor numbers meant that chips were getting smaller and faster as time progressed.

As chips continued to get faster, so did the levels of sophistication within the circuitry. Companies were constantly updating machinery to be able to keep up with production demands and overhauls of newer circuits. Companies raced to make transistors smaller in order to pack more of them on the same size silicon and enable faster chips. This practice became known as "shrinkage".

Companies were now in a race against each other and themselves to create the next fastest chip, as all goals were to meet or exceed Moore's Law. With the shrinking of sizes in semiconductors, production became much more intricate. Fabrication machines, which were producing chips at the millimeter level in the 1960s, were now operating in the micrometer and heading into the nanometer scale. As of 2011, most cutting edge processor makers are working in the 32 nm level and heading into full 22 nm production; sizes comparable to the human DNA strand. The process at which most of these intricate chips are being produced at is called photolithography, and the cost of equipment and operating them has grown astronomically, resulting in an inevitable consolidation of semiconductor companies.

== Divergence ==
Companies like Xilinx and Western Design Center were pioneers and the first to realize the practicality of not having to sustain a fabrication plant model. As costs continued to grow and competition grew fierce, resources could not be focused on maintaining a business model that had to sustain research and production. The solution became the Fabless semiconductor company model, where a company could focus all its resources to the design, marketing, and sale of its devices while outsourcing the production of its devices to manufacturers called fabs.

This business model grew in such popularity that the new initiative was being promoted by a group called the Fabless Semiconductor Association (FSA) which is now the Global Semiconductor Alliance.

These fabs, commonly referred to as foundries, were able to update assembly and photolithography systems much more easily than their counterparts as all they focused on is handling bulk orders that come from these fabless businesses. In addition, the bottom line of these two business models became much stronger.

== Convergence ==
While companies have profited from a fabless business model, it has become less sustainable in the modern era. The modern day microprocessor requires billions of dollars of research, months or years of research and teams of hundreds of engineers testing and developing the chip. As such, smaller, less vertically integrated companies (such as fabless companies), have become less practical.

"On one side will be Intel and a select few that can afford their own fab plants—which will cost between $2.5 billion and $3 billion to build in 2003 and $6 billion by 2007—and perform basic research on transistor design or new chip materials. These new fabs will process wafers with 300-millimeter diameters, larger and more complex to make than today's 200-millimeter variety. On the other side will be everyone else. They will have to share fabs, pool research, buy technology or rely more heavily on outside foundries, which in turn will have to seek help." The theory, Rock's Law, was first articulated by venture capitalist Arthur Rock in which he proposed that the cost of a fabrication plant doubles every 4 years and eventually gets to the point in which it will collide with Moore's law. The implication is that rising plant costs will eventually prohibit further chip improvements. Realizing this, companies began to collaborate. This also meant many compatible companies ended up being takeover targets in order to strengthen relationships and help the businesses' bottom line.

in July, 2006, AMD announced the acquisition of the GPU manufacturer ATI Technologies for $4.3 billion in cash and 58 million shares of its stock and completed the acquisition on October 25, 2006. In October 2008, AMD announced plans to spin off manufacturing operations in a joint venture with Advanced Technology Investment Co., an investment company from Abu Dhabi. The partnership and resulting new venture, called GlobalFoundries Inc., gave AMD an infusion of cash and allowed the company to focus solely on chip design.

TI and Infineon have outsourced some production to Shanghai's Semiconductor Manufacturing International Corporation

Motorola, ST Microelectronics, Philips and Taiwan Semiconductor Manufacturing Co. are collaborating.

In 2000, Sony Computer Entertainment, Toshiba Corporation, and IBM teamed up to design and manufacture the Cell processor. The alliance of the three companies was known as "STI" and over 400 engineers from the three companies worked together in Austin, Texas in a facility specifically built for the project in 2001. The processor has since been used in numerous commercial products, including some IBM BladeCenter servers and the Sony PS3 gaming console.

The outsourced semiconductor assembly and test (OSAT) industry has also seen a considerable amount of consolidation in recent years. This is because OSAT companies are looking to differentiate themselves, and consolidation, in a horizontal sense, is one of the most effective known ways to achieve better differentiation.

== Exceptions ==
According to analysts, the trend is that there will be an industry-wide move toward collaboration. However, companies such as Intel, IBM, and Toshiba will be able to survive on their own as they are currently market leaders in the microprocessors, servers, and memory fields (in that order).

== See also ==
- Foundry model
- Semiconductor device fabrication
