= Ellen Hancock =

American businesswoman (1943–2022)

Ellen Mooney Hancock (April 15, 1943 – April 19, 2022) was a technology manager from the United States who worked for IBM and Apple, among others.

== Early life and education ==
Hancock was born April 15, 1943, in the Bronx, New York City, and raised in New York's Westchester County. She graduated from the College of New Rochelle and earned a master's degree in mathematics from Fordham University.

== Career ==
=== IBM ===
Hancock spent 29 years at IBM, where she rose to senior vice president in charge of network hardware and software. She ran the networking hardware division through the first half of the 1990s, at a time when it saw double-digit losses in market share year after year. (The division was ultimately sold to Cisco in 1999.) She was also a member of the IBM Corporate Executive Committee and the IBM Worldwide Management Council.

=== National Semiconductor ===
In September 1995, she was hired away from IBM by Gil Amelio to become National Semiconductor's Executive Vice President and Chief Operating Officer (COO). She worked closely with Amelio to move National Semiconductor to profitability. During that time, Hancock worked with National's CompactRISC architecture, which was a forerunner to the successful ARM7 architecture. Not long after that, Gil Amelio left National Semiconductor to become CEO at Apple Computer, and in July 1996 Gil Amelio hired Hancock to join him there.

=== Apple ===
Ellen Hancock was employed at Apple Computer, Inc. under the leadership of Gil Amelio.

At Apple, Hancock took over the Chief Technology Officer role in the midst of the floundering next-generation operating system (OS) project named Copland. She was largely responsible for the decision to cancel Copland. To replace it, Hancock had favored Sun Microsystems's Solaris operating system over NeXT Inc.'s NeXTSTEP, and was against the eventual purchase of NeXT. Even after the deal was done, she wanted to use at least the kernel of Solaris. With NeXT came Steve Jobs, who publicly lampooned her on several occasions calling her a "bozo". When the Apple board of directors fired Gil Amelio, Jobs reorganized the company leaving her with a much reduced role in charge of quality assurance as former NeXT executives took over many positions in Apple. She soon resigned.

=== Exodus Communications ===
After Apple she took a CEO position with Exodus Communications in March 1998 and became chairman of the board in 2000. Exodus set a Nasdaq record of 19 consecutive quarters of 40 percent quarter-over-quarter revenue growth. In 2000, the $29 billion market cap exceeded even that of her former employer, Apple Computer. However, in 2001 the company became part of the dot-com crash, the stock plummeted and Hancock stepped down as CEO in September 2001. The company filed for bankruptcy that same month, followed by an asset purchase by Cable & Wireless in February 2002. Savvis Communications purchased the related assets from C&W in November 2004.

=== Acquicor ===
Hancock served as President, COO, and secretary to the board of Acquicor, a company she co-founded with former Apple CEO Gil Amelio and Apple co-founder Steve Wozniak. The company was a 'blank check' holding company, or "SPAC". Acquicor acquired Jazz Semiconductor in February 2007 and Hancock resigned on June 7, 2007.

== Memberships ==
Hancock was a member on the boards of several companies and academic and nonprofit institutions, including Aetna, Colgate-Palmolive, Electronic Data Systems, Ripcord Networks, Marist College, Santa Clara University, and the Pacific Council on International Policy.
