= Ripcord =

Ripcord or rip cord may refer to:

- Ripcord (skydiving), the mechanism used to release a parachute
- Ripcord, an alternative name for a rope start
- FSB Ripcord, fire support base from the Vietnam War
- Ripcord (album), a 2016 album by Keith Urban
- Ripcord (Amusement Park Ride), an amusement park free-fall ride
- Ripcord (TV series) a 1960s TV series
- Rip Cord (G.I. Joe), a fictional character in the G.I. Joe universe
- Ripcord, a pullstring used with a launcher to make a Beyblade spin
- Ripcord, a cord of yarn under the jacket of an optical cable for jacket removal
- Ripcord Games, a video game publisher
- Ripcord Networks, a voice and video cryptographic security company
- "Ripcord", a song from Radiohead's debut album Pablo Honey

== See also ==
- The Rip Chords, an early-1960s American vocal group
- Ripcordz, a Canadian punk rock band, formed in 1980
- Rip (disambiguation)
- Cord (disambiguation)
