= Fabless manufacturing =

Outsourced fabrication of semiconductors

Fabless manufacturing refers to the design and sale of semiconductor chips while outsourcing their wafer fabrication to specialized manufacturers called semiconductor foundries. These foundries are often located in Taiwan. Fabless companies can benefit from lower capital costs while concentrating their research and development resources on the end market. Some fabless companies and pure play foundries (like TSMC) may offer integrated-circuit design services to third parties.

== History ==
Prior to the 1980s, the semiconductor industry was vertically integrated. Semiconductor companies owned and operated their own silicon-wafer fabrication facilities and developed their own process technology for manufacturing their chips. These companies also carried out the assembly and testing of their own chips.

As with most technology-intensive industries, the silicon manufacturing process presents high barriers to entry into the market, especially for small start-up companies. But integrated device manufacturers (IDMs) had excess production capacity. This presented an opportunity for smaller companies, relying on IDMs, to design but not manufacture silicon.

These conditions underlay the birth of the fabless business model. Engineers at new companies began designing and selling integrated circuits (ICs) without owning a fabrication plant.

In the mid-1980s, Gordon A. Campbell at Chips and Technologies was among the first to use and promote the fabless model, at the time outsourcing wafer fabrication to Japan.

In 1987, Taiwan Semiconductor Manufacturing Corporation was established by Dr. Morris Chang in Taiwan, leading to a period of growth for Taiwan's fab industry. Foundries became the cornerstone of the fabless model, providing a non-competitive manufacturing partner for fabless companies.

The co-founders of the first fabless semiconductor company, LSI Computer Systems, Inc. (LSI/CSI) LSI/CSI, worked together at General Instrument Microelectronics (GIM) in the 1960s. In 1969 GIM was hired to develop three full custom CPU circuits for Control Data Corporation (CDC). These CPU ICs operated at 5 MHz (state of the art at the time) and were incorporated in the CDC Computer 469. The Computer 469 became a standard CDC Aerospace Computer and was used in the Spy in the Sky Satellites in addition to other classified satellite programs.

GIM was reluctant to proceed with the next phase of the program, which it deemed to be too technically challenging. The GIM engineers who had worked on the project were encouraged by CDC to form their own company to provide five new custom circuits. This resulted in the formation of LSI Computer Systems, Inc. (LSI/CSI) in 1969. The new chips were power-efficient random logic circuits with extremely high circuit densities. These new circuits also operated at 5 MHz. These devices were designated LSI0101, LSI0102, LSI0103, LSI0104, and LSI0105 and were manufactured in compact 40-pin metal flat packs with 0.050 inches (1.3 mm) spacing.

In creating the fabless semiconductor industry, LSI/CSI had to do the following:

1. Select a suitable and CDC certifiable wafer fab house.
2. Monitor the process, and inspection of all wafers per Class S requirements and visuals.
3. Perform all In-Process inspections of the wafers.
4. Select a highly reliable packaging house capable of meeting CDC's Class S assembly requirements.
5. Have CDC certify and approve the assembly facility and its processes.
6. perform all required environmental testing at Class S approved facilities.
7. prepare and submit all environmental test reports.

CDC's Aerospace Computer 469 weighed one pound, consumed a total of 10 watts and ran at 5 MHz. CDC ran a parallel program, developing a chipset of eight similar parts that were to operate at 2.5 MHz with the identical environmental and Class S requirements. CDC had initial difficulties with this project, but eventually awarded another contract to LSI/CSI to manage the processing, inspection, visuals, assembly, and testing of the ICs. These parts were given the designation LSI3201, LSI3202, LSI3203, LSI3204 and LSI3205. Another successful space program completed by LSI/CSI was the upgrade to class S of a Standard Brushless DC Motor Commutator/Controller Chip, LS7262, which was implemented in satellites.

In 1994, Jodi Shelton, along with a half a dozen CEOs of fabless companies, established the Fabless Semiconductor Association (FSA) to promote the fabless business-model globally. In December 2007, the FSA transitioned to the GSA, the Global Semiconductor Alliance. The organizational transition reflected the role FSA had played as a global organization that collaborated with other organizations to co-host international events.

== Industry growth and success ==
The fabless manufacturing model has been further validated by the conversion of major IDMs to a completely fabless model, including (for example) Conexant Systems, Semtech, and most recently, LSI Logic. Today most major IDMs including Infineon and Cypress Semiconductor have adopted the practice of outsourcing chip manufacturing as a significant manufacturing strategy.

== Sales leaders ==
The top 5 sales leaders for fabless companies (IC Design Houses) in 2024 were:

Rank	Company	Headquarters	Revenue (million US$)
1	Nvidia	United States	124,377
2	Qualcomm	United States	34,857
3	Broadcom	United States	30,644
4	AMD	United States	25,785
5	MediaTek	Taiwan	16,519

The top 5 sales leaders for fabless companies (IC Design Houses) in 2023 were:

Rank	Company	Headquarters	Revenue (million US$)
1	Nvidia	United States	55,268
2	Qualcomm	United States	30,913
3	Broadcom	United States	28,445
4	AMD	United States	22,680
5	MediaTek	Taiwan	13,888

The top 5 sales leaders for fabless companies in 2020 were:

Rank	Company	Headquarters	Revenue (million US$)
1 ▲	Qualcomm	United States	19,407
2 ▼	Broadcom	United States	17,745
3	Nvidia	United States	15,412
4	MediaTek	Taiwan	10,929
5	AMD	United States	9,763

The top 5 sales leaders for fabless companies in 2019 were:

Rank	Company	Headquarters	Revenue (million US$)
1	Broadcom	United States	17,246
2	Qualcomm	United States	14,518
3	Nvidia	United States	10,125
4	MediaTek	Taiwan	7,962
5	AMD	United States	6,731

The top 5 sales leaders for fabless companies in 2017 were:

Rank	Company	Headquarters	Revenue (million US$)
1	Qualcomm	United States	17,078
2	Broadcom	United States	16,065
3	Nvidia	United States	9,228
4	MediaTek	Taiwan	7,875
5	Apple	United States	6,660

The top 5 sales leaders for fabless companies in 2013 were:

Rank	Company	Headquarters	Revenue (million US$)
1	Qualcomm	United States	17,200
2	Broadcom	United States	8,200
3	AMD	United States	5,300
4	MediaTek	Taiwan	4,600
5	Nvidia	United States	3,900

The top 5 sales leaders for fabless companies in 2011 were:

Rank	Company	Headquarters	Revenue (million US$)
1	Qualcomm	United States	9,910
2	Broadcom	United States	7,160
3	AMD	United States	6,568
4	Nvidia	United States	3,939
5	Marvell	United States	3,445

The top 5 sales leaders for fabless companies in 2010 were:

Rank	Company	Headquarters	Revenue (million US$)
1	Qualcomm	United States	7,098
2	Broadcom	United States	6,540
3	AMD	United States	6,460
4	MediaTek	Taiwan	3,610
5	Marvell	United States	3,602

The top 5 sales leaders for fabless companies in 2003 were:

Rank	Company	Headquarters	Revenue (million US$)
1	Qualcomm	United States	2,398
2	NVIDIA	United States	1,716
3	Broadcom	United States	1,610
4	ATI Technologies	Canada	1,401
5	Xilinx	United States	1,300

== See also ==
- ARM Holdings has an alternative fabless semiconductor design business model.
- Foundry model
- Moore's second law
- Semiconductor consolidation
- Semiconductor device fabrication
- Semiconductor equipment sales leaders by year
- Semiconductor foundry sales leaders by year
- Semiconductor intellectual property core (IP cores)
