= Global Unichip Corporation =

Taiwanese ASIC designer

- Type: Public (TWSE: 3443)
- Industry: Semiconductor
- Founded: 1998 at the Hsinchu, Taiwan
- Headquarters: Hsinchu Science Park in Hsinchu, Taiwan
- Key people: Chairman : Dr. F.C. Tseng, President: Dr. Ken Chen
- Products: ASIC
- Number of employees: 800+ (2021)
- Website: www.guc-asic.com

Global Unichip Corporation
- Traditional Chinese: 創意電子
Transcriptions
Standard Mandarin
- Hanyu Pinyin: Chuàngyì diànzǐ

Global Unichip Corporation (GUC) is a worldwide fabless ASIC design service company headquartered in the Hsinchu Science Park in Hsinchu, Taiwan.

== Overview ==
Founded in 1998, GUC is a dedicated system-on-chip design foundry based in Taiwan. TSMC became its largest shareholder in 2003.

== Facilities ==
- Headquarter in Hsinchu, Taiwan
- Taipei, Taiwan
- Tainan, Taiwan
- San Jose, California, United States
- Yokohama, Japan
- Seoul, South Korea
- Amsterdam, Netherlands
- Shanghai, China
- Shenzhen, China
- Beijing, China
- Nanjing, China

== Products ==
ASICs and wafers
Design, wafer manufacturing, packaging and testing services
Non-recurring engineering
Circuit design cell library and various IPs required in the product design process; circuit layouts for mask making; subcontract mask making, wafer manufacturing, dicing and packaging to vendors; final testing to get prototype samples
Multi-project wafer service
Integrates multiple design projects of different customers on one single mask and by one wafer engineer run. It is an effective and fast time-to-market chip verification service with cost-sharing in masking and wafer engineering run. Design engineers, before the phase of mass production, are able to timely verify their prototype designs with advanced process technologies and much lower costs
Intellectual property
Silicon-verified reusable IC designs with specific functions

== See also ==
- List of companies of Taiwan
