= Gil Amelio =

American technology executive (born 1943)

- Born: Gilbert Frank Amelio; March 1, 1943 (age 83); New York City, New York, U.S.
- Occupations: Computer science, businessman
- Known for: CEO of National Semiconductor and Apple

Gilbert Frank Amelio (born March 1, 1943) is an American technology executive. Amelio worked at Bell Labs, Fairchild Semiconductor, and the semiconductor division of Rockwell International, and was also the CEO of National Semiconductor and Apple Computer.

== Early life and career ==
Amelio grew up in Miami, Florida, of Italian born parents, and graduated from Miami High School. He received a bachelor's degree, master's degree, and PhD in physics from the Georgia Institute of Technology. While at Georgia Tech, Amelio was a member of the Pi Kappa Alpha fraternity.

Amelio joined Bell Labs as a researcher in 1968. In 1970, Amelio was on the team that demonstrated the first working charge-coupled device (CCD). He moved to Fairchild Semiconductor in 1971, where he led the development of the first commercial CCD image sensors in the early 1970s, and in 1977 became head of the MOS division. He worked his way up to president of the semiconductor division of Rockwell International, and then its communications systems division.

Amelio joined National Semiconductor as president and chief executive in February 1991.

== Apple Computer ==
In 1994 Amelio joined the board of directors of Apple. After his resignation from National Semiconductor, Amelio became Apple CEO on February 2, 1996, succeeding Michael Spindler. His salary was a reported $990,000 plus bonuses and a $5 million loan. He also received approximately $100,000 for the use of his business jet by Apple the previous year according to the section "Certain Transactions" in the Apple Proxy Statement for 1996.

Amelio cited several problems at Apple including a shortage of cash and liquidity, low-quality products, lack of a viable operating system strategy, undisciplined corporate culture, and fragmentation in trying to do too much and in too many directions. To address these problems, Amelio cut costs, reduced Apple's work force by one third, discontinued the Copland operating system project, and oversaw the development of Mac OS 8.

To replace Copland and fulfill the need for a next generation operating system Amelio started negotiations to buy BeOS from Be Inc. but negotiations stalled when Be CEO Jean-Louis Gassée demanded $275 million; Apple was unwilling to offer more than $200 million. In November 1996 Amelio started discussions with Steve Jobs's NeXT, and bought the company on February 4, 1997, for $400 million.

During Amelio's tenure Apple's stock continued to slump and hit a 12-year low in Q2 1997 that was at least partially caused by a single sale of 1.5 million shares of Apple stock on June 26 by an anonymous party who was later confirmed to be Steve Jobs. Apple lost another $708 million. On the weekend of July 5-6, 1997, Jobs convinced the directors to oust Amelio in a boardroom coup; Amelio submitted his resignation less than a week later; and Jobs then became interim CEO on September 16. Jobs later quoted Amelio as having said:

Apple is like a ship with a hole in the bottom, leaking water, and my job is to get the ship pointed in the right direction.

It was reported that Amelio's contract gave him about $3.5 million in severance pay, after a $2.3 million performance bonus in 1996.

== Post-Apple career ==
Since 1998 Amelio has been a venture capitalist. In February 2001, Amelio became CEO of Advanced Communications Technologies (ADC). ADC is the United States arm of an Australian firm that has developed a product for the wireless communications industry called SpectruCell. He became senior partner at Sienna Ventures in Sausalito, California in May 2001.

In 2005 he co-founded Acquicor with ex-Apple CTO Ellen Hancock and Apple co-founder Steve Wozniak. Acquicor acquired Jazz Semiconductor in early 2007, and sold it in 2008 for a loss.

Amelio was a director and chairman of the Semiconductor Industry Association. Since 1996 he has been an advisor to the Malaysia Multimedia Super Corridor and to Malaysia's Prime Minister. In June 2003 he was named chairman of the board of Ripcord Networks; where he joined Steve Wozniak, Ellen Hancock, and other Apple alumni. Amelio was a board member of AT&T Inc., Pacific Telesis, Chiron Corporation, Sematech, InterDigital, and Georgia Tech (as chairman), as well as a trustee of the American Film Institute.

He was a contributor to the report An American Imperative (1993), and author of the books Profit from Experience (1995, ISBN 978-0471287049) and On the Firing Line: My 500 Days at Apple (1998, ISBN 978-0887309199).

In November 2020, Amelio joined the board of directors for Nashville-based augmented reality startup VideoBomb.

Amelio joined the board of directors for Mimms Museum of Technology and Art in September 2023.

== Awards and honors ==
Amelio is an IEEE Fellow. He received the IEEE Masaru Ibuka Consumer Electronics Award in 1991 for contributions to the development of the charge-coupled device (CCD) image sensors in consumer video cameras. He has been awarded 16 patents.

== Books ==
- Amelio, Gil; Simon, William L. (1996). Profit from Experience: The National Semiconductor Story of Transformation. New York: Van Nostrand Reinhold. ISBN 9780442020552. OCLC 32970464.
  - Amelio, Gil; Simon, William L. (1997). Profit from Experience: Practical, Proven Skills for Transforming Your Organization. New York: Pocket Books. ISBN 9780684837024. OCLC 37109222. Reprint of the above?
- Amelio, Gil; Simon, William L. (1999). On the Firing Line: My 500 Days at Apple. New York: Harper Business. ISBN 978-0-88730-919-9. OCLC 41424094.

Preceded by Michael Spindler	Apple CEO; 1996–1997	Succeeded by Steve Jobs
Preceded by Mike Markkula	Apple Chairman; 1996–1997	Succeeded by Steve Jobs
