= Hsinchu Science Park =

Industrial park in Taiwan

Coordinates: 24°46′48″N 121°00′49″E

Hsinchu Science Park 新竹科學園區
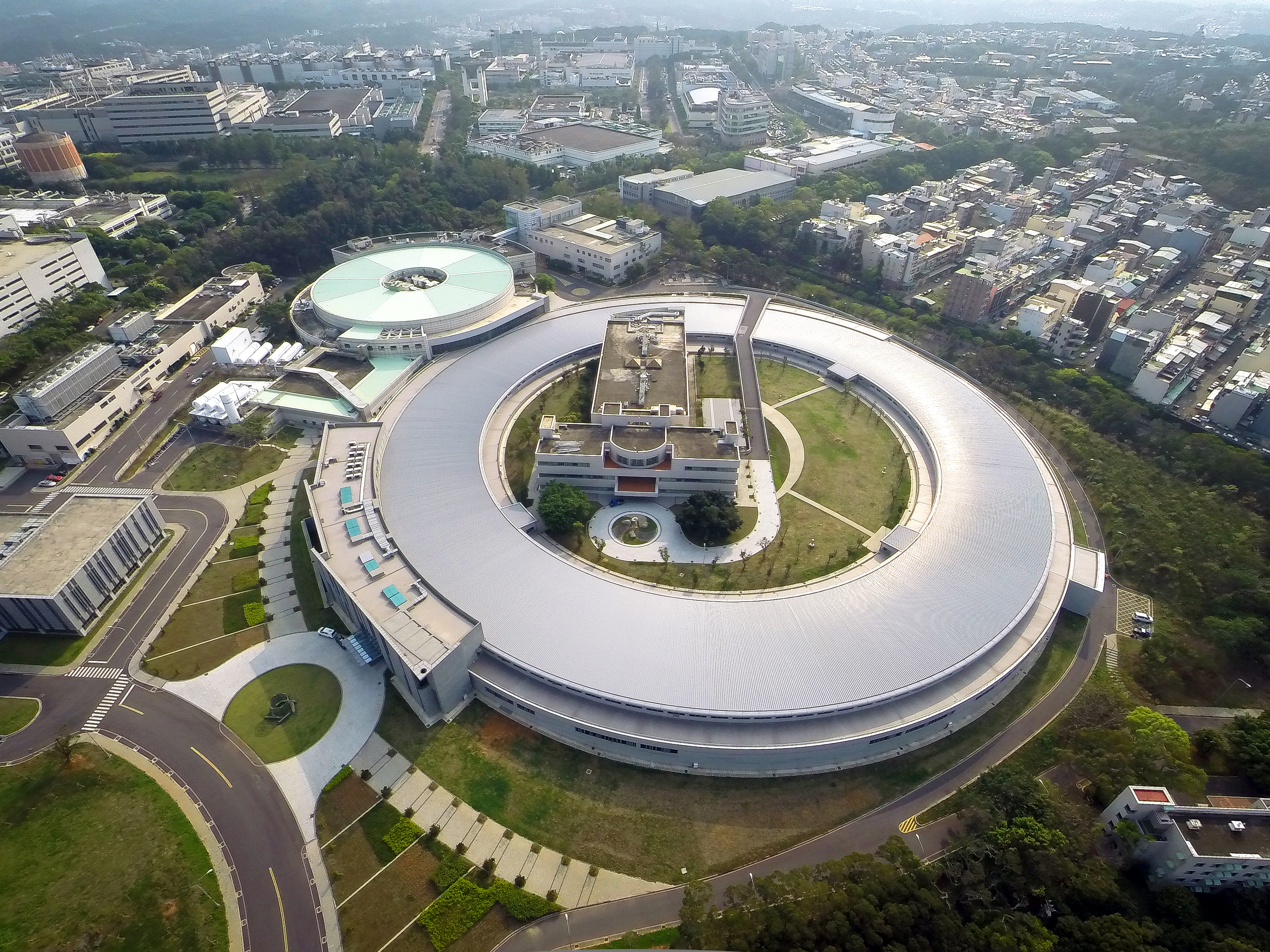
- National Synchrotron Radiation Research Center at Hsinchu Science Park
- Interactive map of Hsinchu Science Park 新竹科學園區
- Location: Taiwan
- Opening date: Hsinchu campus: 1980; 46 years ago Tongluo and Zhunan campuses: 1997; 29 years ago Biomedical campus: 2003; 23 years ago Longtan campus: 2004; 22 years ago Yilan campus: 2005; 21 years ago
- Manager: Hsinchu Science Park Bureau, NSTC (國家科學及技術委員會新竹科學園區管理局)
- No. of tenants: 584 companies (as of 2024-12)
- No. of workers: 177,389 workers (as of 2024-10)
- Size: 1,471 ha (3,630 acres)
- Website: https://web.sipa.gov.tw

The Hsinchu Science Park (HSP; traditional Chinese: 新竹科學園區; simplified Chinese: 新竹科学园区; pinyin: Xīnzhú Kēxué Yuánqū; Pe̍h-ōe-jī: Sin-tek Kho-ha̍k Kang-gia̍p Hn̂g-khu) is an industrial park complex that originated as one campus straddling Hsinchu City and Hsinchu County. It later expanded to Zhunan and Tongluo in Miaoli County, and presently covers six campuses across northern Taiwan. It was established by the government of Taiwan on 15 December 1980. While the whole complex and the first campus share the same name, the name Hsinchu Science Park usually refers to the campus rather than the whole complex.

== History ==
The idea of establishing Hsinchu Science Park was first proposed by Shu Shien-Siu, the Minister of Science and Technology and the former president of National Tsing Hua University. After Shu became minister in 1973, he traveled to the United States, Europe, and Japan to study the conditions under which science and technology were being developed. In 1976, Shu came up with the idea of building a science and technology park like that of Silicon Valley. President Chiang Ching-kuo proposed to build the park in Longtan District because of the potential future benefits that could be drawn from National Chung-Shan Institute of Science and Technology and the military. However, Shu argued that the park should not be close to the military, since its primary goal was to expand the size of the private economy while strengthening creative vitality in Taiwan. Instead, Shu proposed to build the park in Hsinchu next to National Tsing Hua University and the (then) National Chiao Tung University, just like Silicon Valley, which is adjacent to Stanford University and the University of California, Berkeley. His idea was ultimately approved by Chiang, and the park opened in 1980 in Hsinchu.

After the original idea and location were settled, Chiang Ching-kuo tasked Irving Tze Ho (何宜慈) (1921–2003) with setting up the park in 1979; he later served as its first director. Li Kwoh-ting, former Finance Minister of the Republic of China, was among those who significantly contributed to the founding of the park, as ordered by Chiang. Inspired by Silicon Valley, Li consulted Frederick Terman on how Taiwan could follow its example. From there, Li convinced talents who had gone abroad to build companies in Hsinchu Science Park. Among those who returned was Morris Chang, who later led the Industrial Technology Research Institute (ITRI) and founded TSMC. Li also introduced the concept of venture capital to the country to attract funds for finance high-tech startups in Taiwan.

=== Timeline ===
- 1 October 1977: Taiwanese Industrial Technology Research Institute (工研院) established the first 4-inch wafer demonstration factory in Taiwan.
- 10 January 1979: Construction began on the Science and Industrial Park (科學工業園區) situated at eastern suburbs of Hsinchu city, and the park would focus on electronics contract manufacturing.
- 15 December 1980: The construction of Science and Industrial Park has completed, alongside the creation of the administration ministry Science Park Bureau, National Science Council.
- 1986: The first specialized wastewater treatment plant was activated by the park to address pollution from manufacturing.
- 1990: Construction began on the Longtan Science and Industrial Park in Longtan Township, Taoyuan County.
- 1 July 1997: The government reviewed the options and agreed on the expansion of the industrial parks, which would locate in Zhunan Township and Tongluo Township in Miaoli County, adjacent to the south of Hsinchu County. Later the two locations became their respective science parks.
- 1 July 1999: Construction began on the Zhunan Science Park.
- 1 June 2001: The government agreed on the establishment of Biomedical Science Park, which was officially established almost two years later, on 28 March 2003.
- 28 January 2004: The Longtan Science and Industrial Park was officially incorporated into the Science and Industrial Park.
- 16 May 2005: The government approved on the establishment of Yilan Science and Industrial Park.
- 8 February 2007: Construction began on the Tongluo Science and Industrial Park.
- 1 March 2014: The Science and Industrial Park was renamed to Hsinchu Science and Industrial Park.
- 2019: The "industrial" in the name was dropped. The park complex was further renamed to Hsinchu Science Park.

== Overview ==
The park houses more than 500 high-tech companies, mainly involved in the semiconductor, computer, telecommunication, and optoelectronics industries, have been established in the park since the end of December 2003. Its 400 technology companies accounted for 10% of Taiwan's gross domestic product in 2007. It is home to the world's top two semiconductor foundries, Taiwan Semiconductor Manufacturing Company (TSMC) and United Microelectronics Corporation (UMC), both of which were established at the nearby Industrial Technology Research Institute. Taiwan is the only country that possesses a professional division-of-labor system in the semiconductor industry and also has the highest density of 12-inch wafer-producing fabs, most of which are based in the park. Next door to the science park are two of Taiwan's science and engineering powerhouses, National Yang Ming Chiao Tung University and National Tsing Hua University, and the National Space Organization, the Taiwanese space agency, are located in the park.

There were local residents' protests against water and air pollution. The Park's industrial wastewater treatment plant began to operate in 1986 and effectively treats wastewater for maximum safety while Taiwan's National Environmental Protection Department monitors the air quality in the park and surrounding areas to maintain clean air quality.

== Locations ==
Currently, the Hsinchu Science Park complex covers six campuses, with a total development area of 1,471 hectares:

- Hsinchu Science Park in East District, Hsinchu City and Baoshan, Hsinchu County
- Zhunan Science Park in Zhunan, Miaoli County
- Longtan Science Park in Longtan District, Taoyuan
- Tongluo Science Park in Tongluo Township, Miaoli County
- Yilan Science Park in Yilan City, Yilan County
- Biomedical Science Park in Zhubei, Hsinchu County

== Major companies located in the park ==
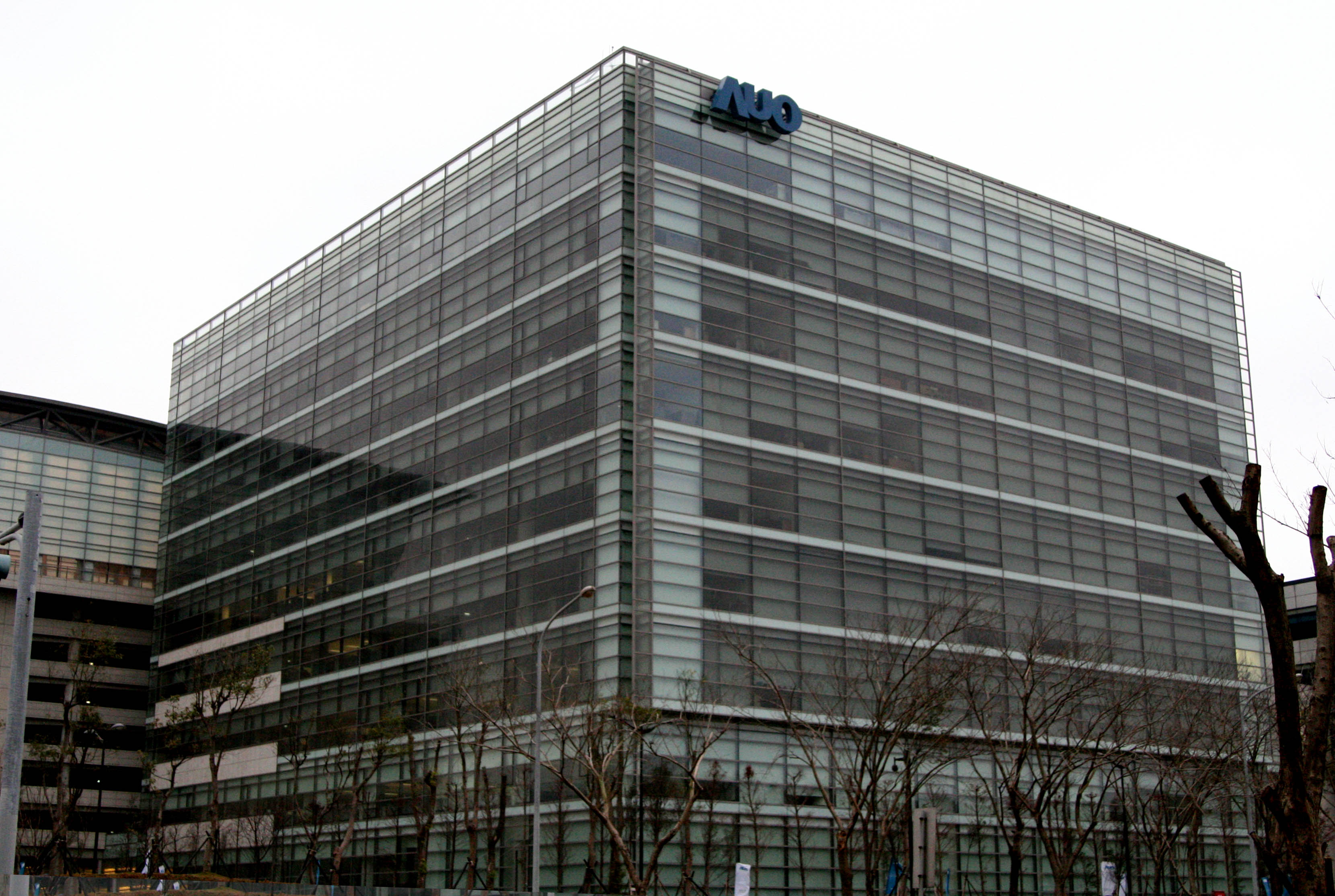
AUO Corporation

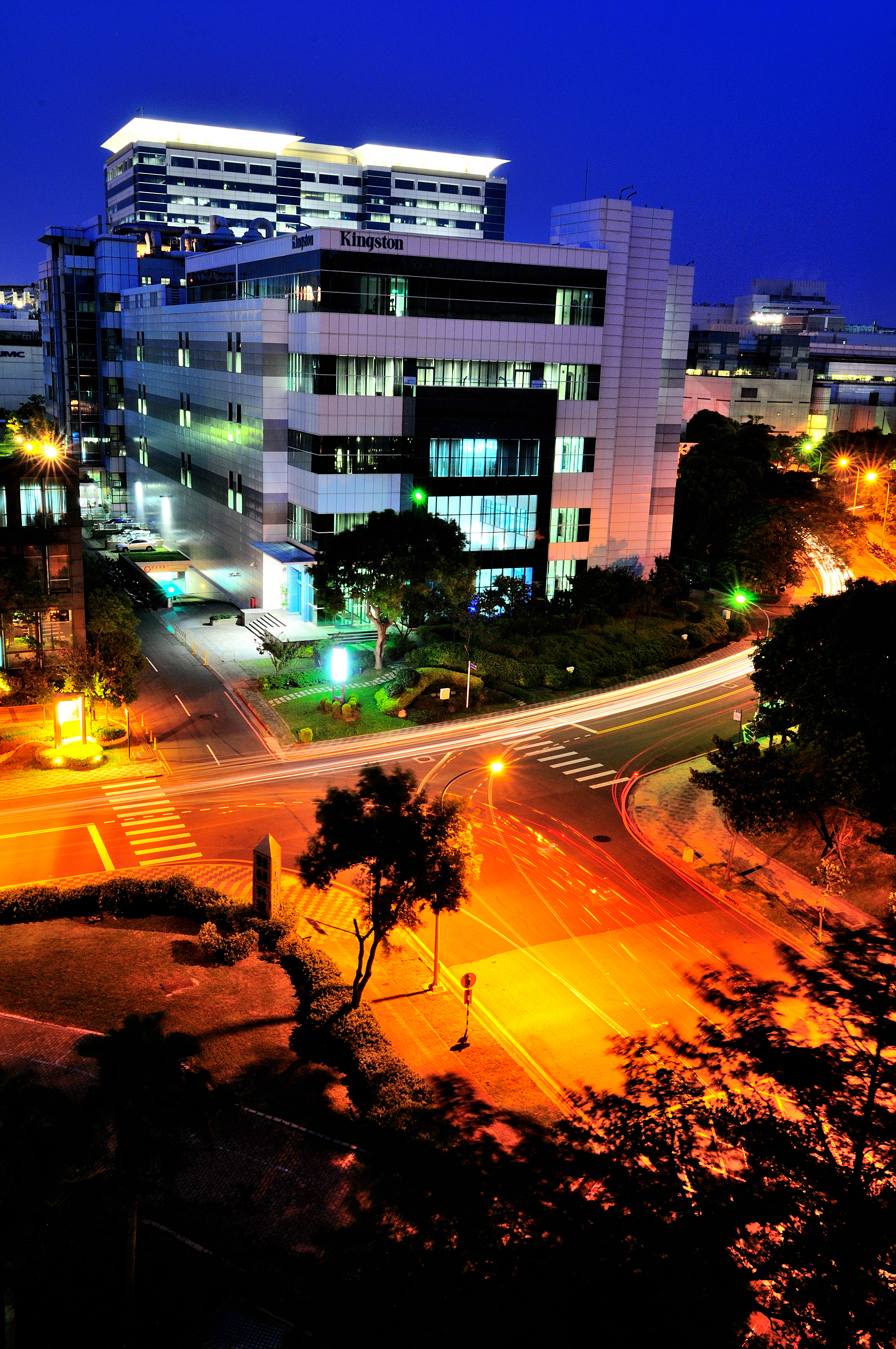
Kingston Technology

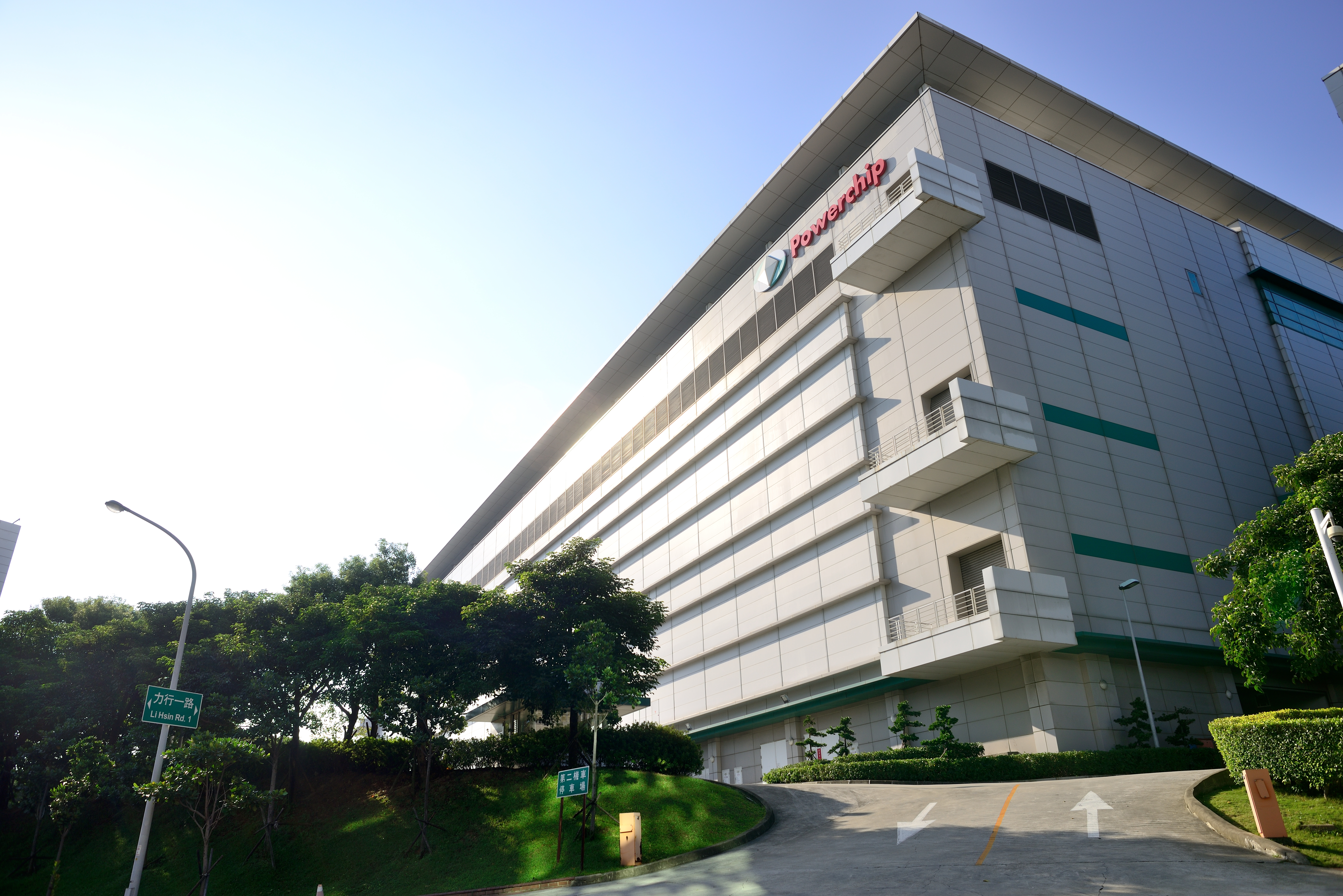
Powerchip Technology headquarters

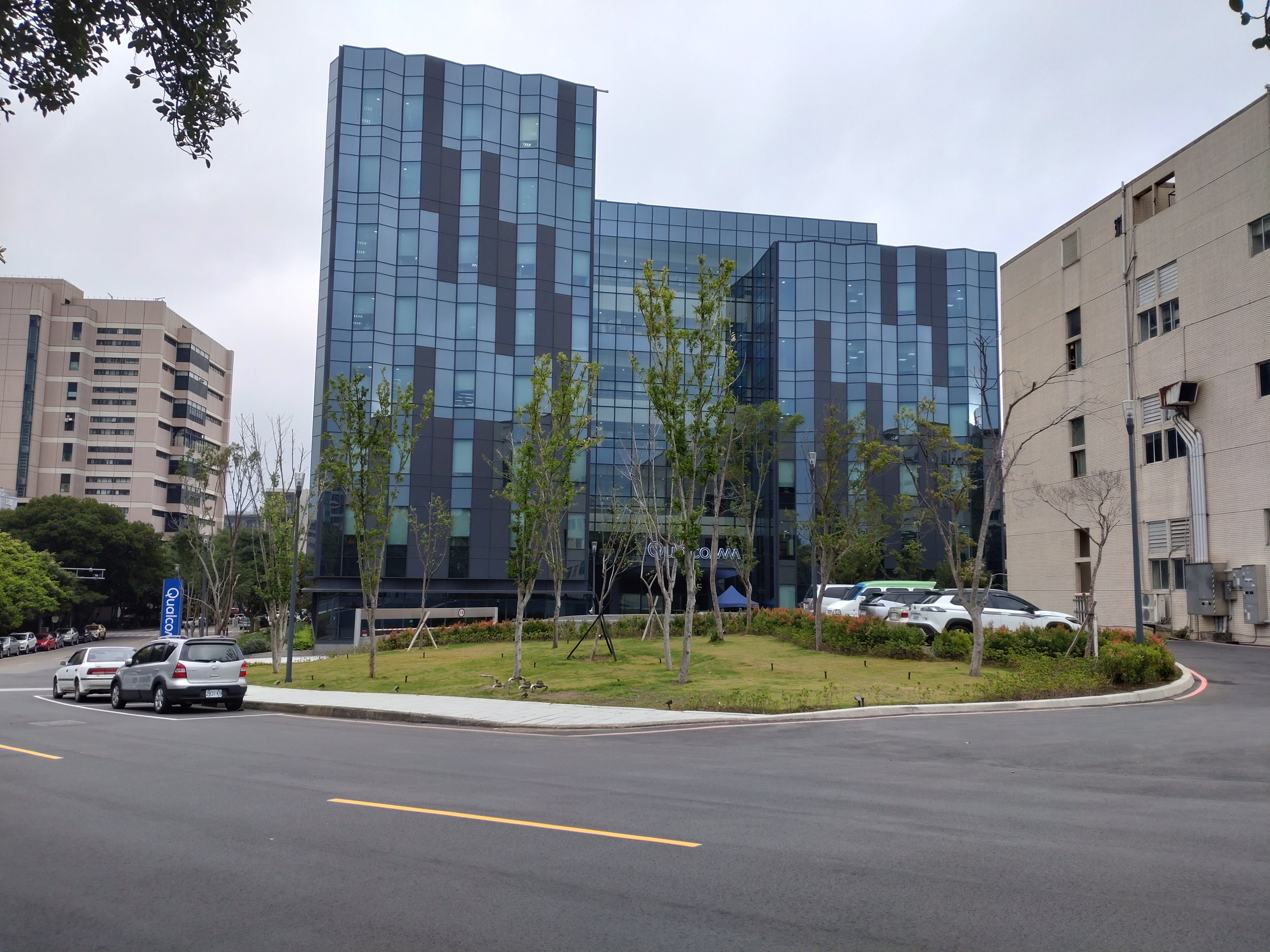
Qualcomm

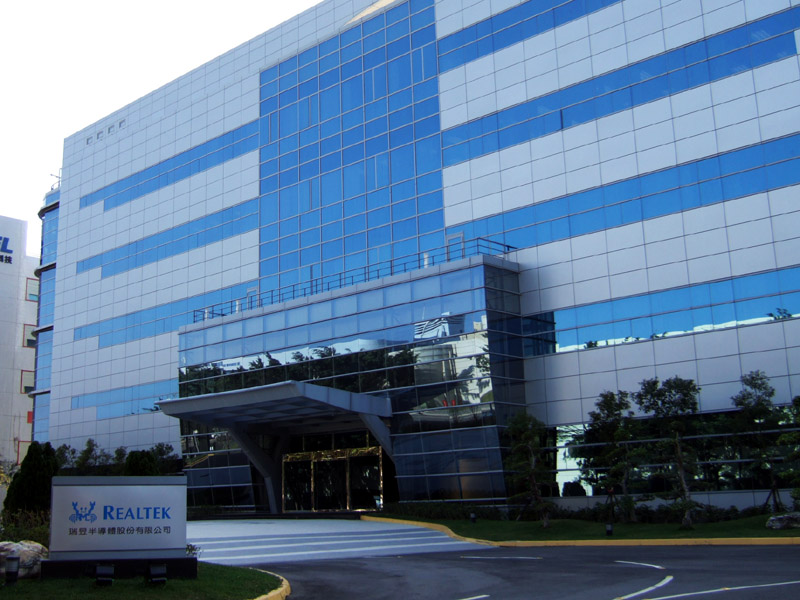
Realtek

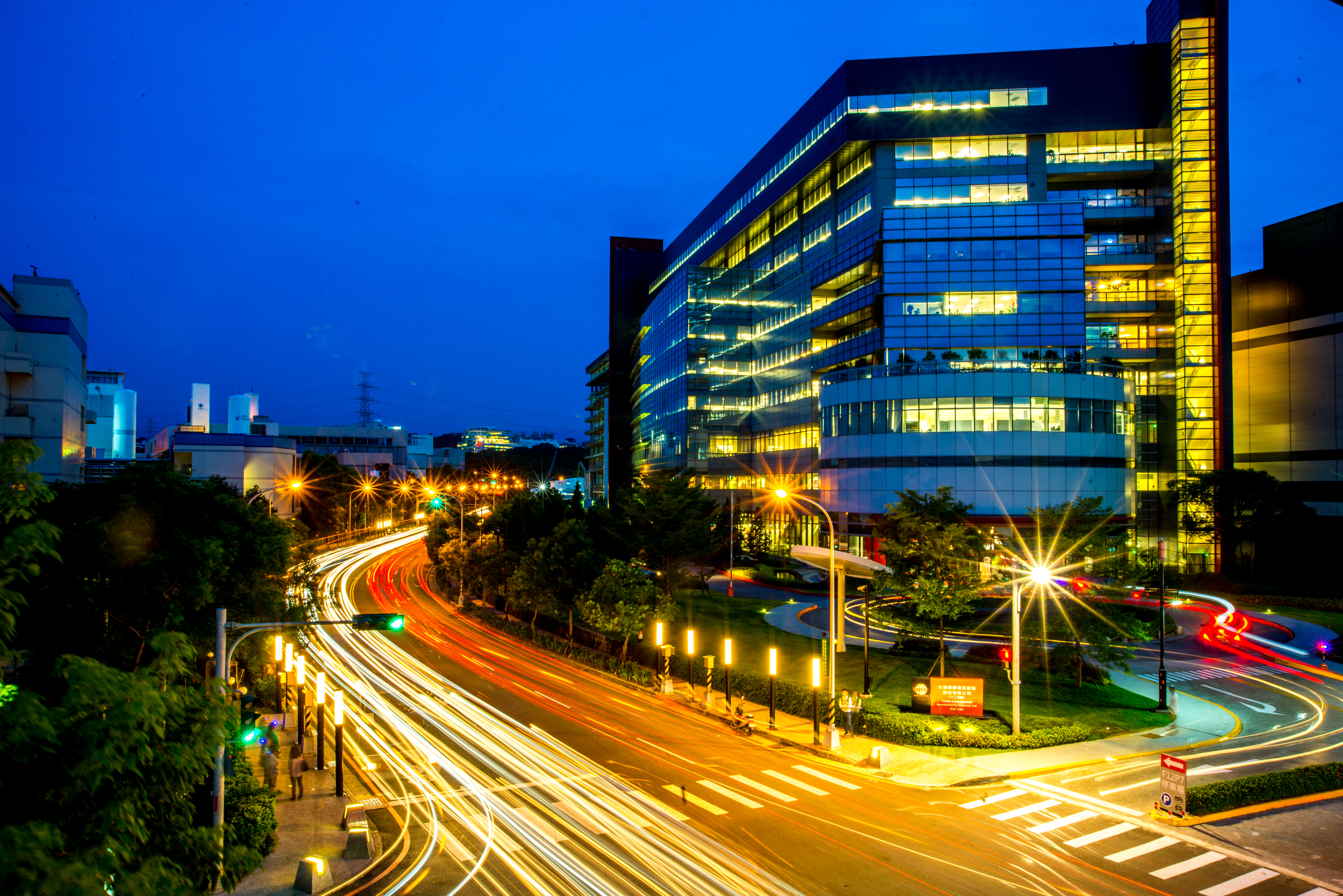
TSMC Fab 12B

- Acer Inc.
- Apple Inc.
- Applied Materials
- Axtronics Inc.
- Alpha Networks Inc.
- AU Optronics
- ChipMOS Technologies, Ltd. (IMOS)
- Chimei Innolux
- Cadence Design Systems
- Coretronic
- Epistar
- Elan Microelectronics Corporation
- Global Unichip Corporation
- Hermes-Epitek
- Holtek
- Kingston Technology
- Lam Research
- Lite-On
- Logitech
- Macronix International (MXIC)
- MediaTek
- Microtek
- MiTAC
- MStar Semiconductor
- MA-tek Inc.
- Novatek
- Nuvoton Technology Corp.
- Optodisc
- Philips
- Powerchip Semiconductor (PSMC)
- ProMOS Technologies
- Qualcomm
- Realtek
- Silicon Integrated Systems
- Shin-Etsu Chemical
- SMOBIO Technology, Inc.
- Sunplus
- Source Photonics
- Tecom - Tecom Co., Ltd
- Tokyo Electron
- TSMC - Taiwan Semiconductor Manufacturing Company Ltd.
- United Microelectronics Corporation
- Vanguard International Semiconductor Corporation
- Wistron
- Winbond
- ZyXEL

== See also ==
- Business cluster
- Economy of Taiwan
- Mega-Site
- Southern Taiwan Science Park
- National Experimental High School: A K-12 school established to provide special education opportunity to personnel of Greater Science Park Area.
