= Global OnLine Japan =

Former Japanese internet service provider

Global OnLine Japan (GOL) was one of Japan's first Internet Service Providers (ISPs). It was founded in September 1994 by a Canadian entrepreneur, Roger J. Boisvert (1951–2001) together with his wife, Yuriko Hiraguri. GOL was known for its @gol.com brand, by succeeding Japan's first commercial Internet operation launched by Roger J. Boisvert at Intercon International K.K.(IIKK) started on September 24, 1993, at an apartment Joichi Itoh (Joi Ito) helped to secure in Tokyo. In December 1999, Exodus Communications acquired GOL. Exodus opened its Tokyo IDC in April 2000 together with Nomura Research Institute. Exodus was purchased by Cable and Wireless in 2001. In 2003, Cable and Wireless Japan known as Cable & Wireless IDC (C&W IDC) sold GOL to Japanese VoIP operator Fusion Communications, merging its existing consumer Internet and VoIP to create Fusion Network Services. Fusion was later acquired by Rakuten Group in 2015.
