= Michael Spindler =

Apple CEO 1993–1996

- Born: December 22, 1942; Berlin, Germany
- Died: September 5, 2016 (aged 73)
- Education: Technical University in Cologne
- Known for: CEO of Apple Computer, Inc.
- Spouse: Maryse
- Children: 3

Michael Spindler (December 22, 1942 – September 5, 2016) was a German businessman who was president and CEO of Apple from 1993 to 1996.

== Career ==
Spindler was born in Berlin, Germany. He graduated from engineering at Technical University in Cologne in 1964, and worked at DEC and Intel before moving to join Apple Computer. Having joined Apple in 1980 after Mike Markkula brought him over to help out with marketing at Apple's European office, he rose through the ranks in Apple's European operations as President of Apple Europe, then President of Apple International. Michael Spindler had built a reputation as a great strategist in business tactics. One of his most successful strategies that soared Apple's global sales included giving Apple's various territories more autonomy over their marketing strategies. In January 1990, then CEO of Apple, John Sculley, appointed Spindler to be Apple's chief operating officer. He was nicknamed "The Diesel" due to his strong work ethic.

On October 15, 1993, Spindler was chosen as Apple's CEO when John Sculley was ousted by Apple's board of directors. Spindler presided over several successful projects, such as the introduction of the PowerPC, as well as some major failures, including the Newton and the Copland operating system. Spindler shied away from the spotlight, preferring instead to work on operational management and strategy without fanfare. After Spindler became CEO, he did not make a public appearance for four months. "I never was an operations guy", Spindler said. "That's not my strength at all". One of his first moves as CEO included massive cost-cutting measures such as laying off workers, ending costly projects and cutting down on R&D projects, freezing executive salaries. During his tenure the Apple board authorized merger discussions with IBM, Sun Microsystems and Philips, but when these went nowhere, he was replaced by Gil Amelio on February 2, 1996.

After Apple, Spindler worked at Upstart Capital, Daimler-Benz, and Bertelsmann. He also served as a trustee for the American Film Institute.

== Personal life ==
From 1985 until his death in 2016, Spindler lived between Paris, France, and San Francisco, California, United States, with his wife, Maryse, and three kids, Karen, Laurie, and John.

== Death ==
Spindler died after a short illness on September 5, 2016. His long-time friend and business partner Jean-Louis Gassée stated, "Mike was an original, highly cultured mind, with high-level geopolitical views of our industry."

Preceded by John Sculley	Apple CEO; 1993–1996	Succeeded by Gil Amelio
