= Moore's second law =

Observation on the growth of construction costs for a semiconductor fab

Rock's law or Moore's second law, named for Arthur Rock or Gordon Moore, says that the cost of a semiconductor chip fabrication plant doubles every four years. As of 2015, the price had reached about 14 billion US dollars.

Rock's law can be seen as the economic flip side to Moore's (first) law—that the number of transistors in a dense integrated circuit doubles every two years. The latter is a direct consequence of the ongoing growth of the capital-intensive semiconductor industry; innovative and popular products mean more profits, meaning more capital available to invest in ever higher levels of large-scale integration, which in turn leads to the creation of even more innovative products.

The semiconductor industry has always been extremely capital-intensive, with ever-dropping manufacturing unit costs. Thus, the ultimate limits to growth of the industry will constrain the maximum amount of capital that can be invested in new products; at some point, Rock's Law will collide with Moore's Law.

It has been suggested that fabrication plant costs have not increased as quickly as predicted by Rock's law—indeed plateauing in the late 1990s—and also that the fabrication plant cost per transistor (which has shown a pronounced downward trend) may be more relevant as a constraint on Moore's Law.

== See also ==
- Semiconductor device fabrication
- Fabless manufacturing
- Wirth's law, an analogous law about software complicating over time
- Semiconductor consolidation
