= Tower Semiconductor =

Integrated circuit manufacturer

Tower Semiconductor Ltd.

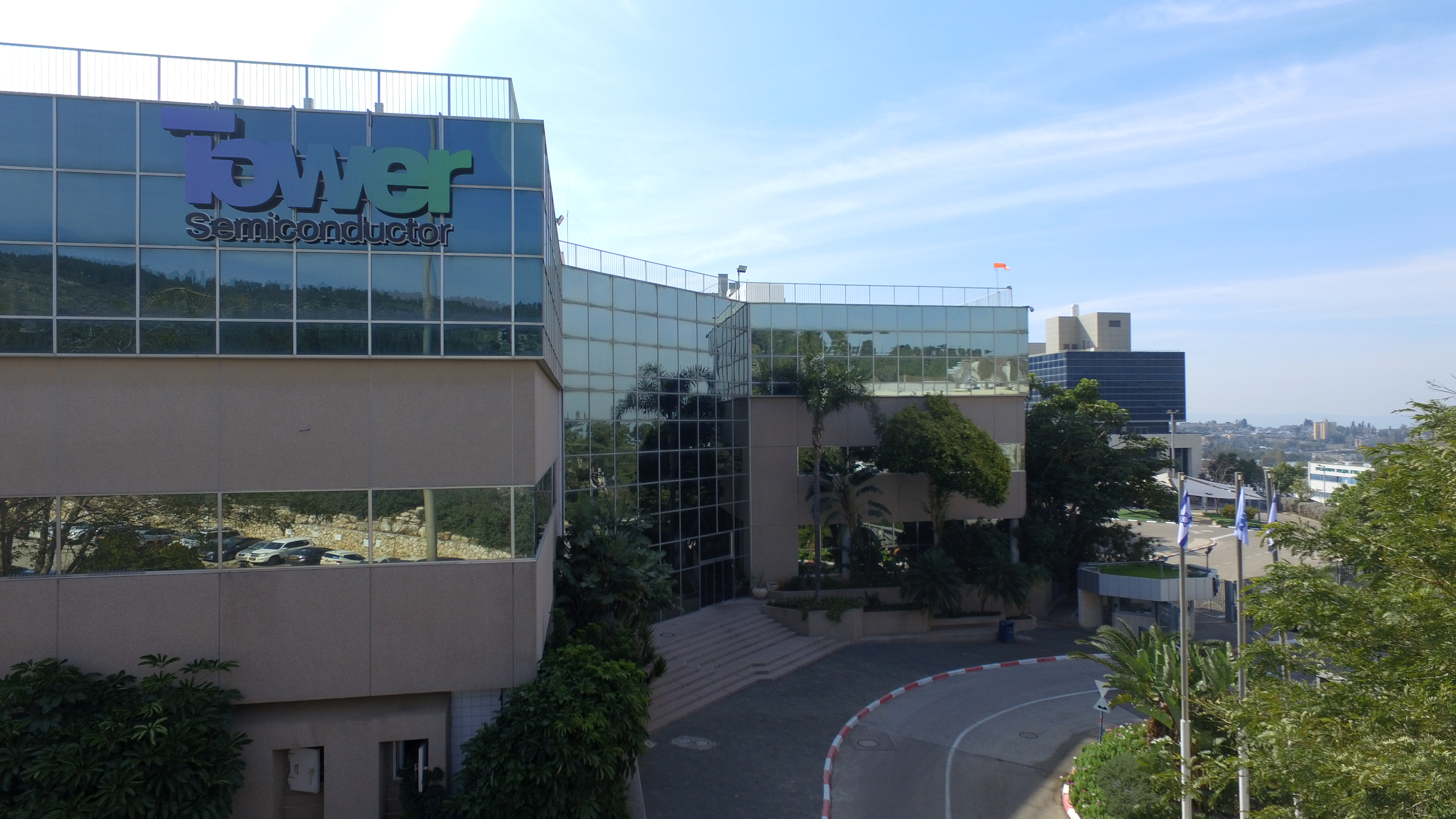
- Headquarters in Migdal Haemek, Israel
- Type: Public
- Traded as: Nasdaq: TSEM; TASE: TSEM; TA-35 Index component
- ISIN: IL0010823792
- Industry: Semiconductor
- Founded: 1993; 33 years ago
- Headquarters: Migdal Haemek, Israel
- Key people: Russell Ellwanger (CEO); Amir Elstein (Chairman)
- Revenue: ▲US$1.57 billion (2025)
- Net income: ▲US$220 million (2025)
- Subsidiaries: Tower Semiconductor Newport Beach, Inc (previously Jazz Semiconductor)
- Website: www.towersemi.com

Tower Semiconductor Ltd.(Nasdaq/TASE: TSEM) is an Israeli company that manufactures integrated circuits using specialty process technologies, including SiGe, BiCMOS, Silicon Photonics, SOI, mixed-signal and RFCMOS, CMOS image sensors, non-imaging sensors, power management (BCD), and non-volatile memory (NVM) as well as MEMS capabilities. Tower Semiconductor also owns 51% of TPSCo, an enterprise with Nuvoton Technology Corporation Japan (NTCJ).

== Overview ==
The company manufactures specialty analog integrated circuits for semiconductor companies such as: On Semiconductor, Intel, Broadcom, Panasonic, Teledyne, Samsung, Innolight, Skyworks Solutions, Semtech and Vishay Siliconix. Moreover, the company also has a qualified open foundry Silicon Photonics platform which is used by companies such as Inphi Corporation. Tower Semiconductor operates manufacturing facilities in Israel, Newport Beach, California, San Antonio, Texas, the Hokuriku region of Japan, and shares a manufacturing facility in Italy with STMicroelectronics. In addition, Tower Semiconductor operates a worldwide design center in Netanya, Israel.

Tower Semiconductor is an Israeli public company that is traded on NASDAQ and the Tel Aviv Stock Exchange, both under the ticker TSEM, and is included in the TA-35 Index and the TA BlueTech Index. In 2010, Tower Semiconductor became the #1 specialty foundry by revenue, with 70% revenue growth year-over-year. On 15 February 2022, Intel announced that it was going to acquire Tower Semiconductor, but this proposed acquisition was terminated due to lack of regulatory approval on 16 August 2023.

== History ==
Tower Semiconductor (NASDAQ / TASE: TSEM) was founded in 1993 and became a public company in 1994. Shares are traded on NASDAQ (TSEM) and Tel Aviv Stock Exchange (TSEM). In January 2001, an adjacent facility (Fab 2) was constructed.

In September 2008, Tower acquired Jazz Semiconductor. In November 2009, the combined companies took the name TowerJazz.

In June 2011, TowerJazz acquired Micron Technology's fabrication facility in Nishiwaki City, Hyogo, Japan. The acquisition nearly doubled TowerJazz's 2010 internal manufacturing capacity and cost-effectively increased production by 60,000 wafers per month.

In April 2014, TowerJazz announced the successful transaction with Panasonic Corporation (First Section of TSE and NSE ticker: 6752) to form a newly established Japanese company, TowerJazz Panasonic Semiconductor Co. (TPSCo) for the manufacture of Panasonic and additional third-party products. TowerJazz announced cessation of its Nishiwaki facility operations in the course of rationalizing and restructuring its manufacturing and business activities in Japan.

In February 2016, TowerJazz announced the successful acquisition of an 8-inch wafer fabrication facility in San Antonio, Texas, United States, from Maxim Integrated Products, Inc.; the consideration of $40 million was paid by approximately 3.3 million ordinary TowerJazz shares. This acquisition increased TowerJazz's production by 28,000 wafers per month.

On 21 August 2017, TowerJazz and Tacoma (Nanjing) Semiconductor Technology Co., Ltd announced that TowerJazz received a first payment from Tacoma (Nanjing) according to their agreement for establishing a partnership to build a wafer fab in China. TowerJazz would provide its technical knowledge and project management skills; meanwhile, Tacoma (Nanjing) and a Chinese regional authority named Nanjing Economic and Technology Development Zone would fully support and fund the project. On 22 June 2020, the Chinese court announced that Tacoma (Nanjing) Semiconductor Technology Co., Ltd was in bankruptcy proceedings.

On March 1, 2020, TowerJazz announced a new brand identity. As of March 2020, the company's official brand name is Tower Semiconductor and includes all of the company's worldwide subsidiaries.

On June 24, 2021 – STMicroelectronics (NYSE:STM), a global semiconductor leader serving customers across the spectrum of electronics applications, and Tower Semiconductor (NASDAQ: TSEM & TASE: TSEM), the leading foundry of high-value analog semiconductor solutions, announced an agreement by which ST welcomes Tower to its Agrate R3 300mm fab on its Agrate Brianza site in Italy.

On February 15, 2022, Intel announced an agreement to acquire Tower Semiconductor for $5.4 billion. However, on August 16, 2023, Intel terminated the acquisition as it failed to obtain approval from Chinese regulators within the 18-month transaction deadline period and will pay a termination fee of $353 million to Tower.

In February 2026, Tower Semiconductor and the Canadian quantum computing firm Xanadu announced a partnership to accelerate the production of photonic quantum hardware. The partnership leverages Tower’s high-volume silicon photonics manufacturing platform to develop scalable, fault-tolerant quantum computers. The companies have co-engineered a unique production flow and custom material stack, including ultra-low loss silicon nitride (SiN), to transition quantum prototypes into high-volume manufacturing environments.

== Fabrication facilities ==
=== Fab 2 8" Migdal Haemek, Israel ===
Fab 2, a 200 mm wafer facility was constructed in January 2001, adjacent to Fab 1 in Migdal Haemek.

=== Fab 3 8" Newport Beach, California ===
Fab 3, located in Newport Beach, California, United States was acquired by Tower when it merged with Jazz Technologies in 2008. Jazz Semiconductor was formed in 2002 and inherited the 200mm facility that was once operated by Rockwell Semiconductor. At Fab 3, Jazz established SiGe, BiCMOS and MEMS technologies and expanded upon its heritage for on-shore, specialized foundry services focused on the Aerospace and Defense industry.

=== Fab 9 8" San Antonio, Texas ===
Fab 9, located in San Antonio, Texas, United States was acquired by Tower in 2016 from Maxim Integrated.

=== Fab 11 12" Agrate, Italy ===
Towers shares a 300mm facility in Agrate, Italy with STMicroelectronics.

=== Additional fabs through TPSCo ===
TPSCo is 51% owned by Tower Semiconductor Ltd. and 49% owned by Nuvoton Technology Corporation Japan. TPSCo has two manufacturing facilities in Hokuriku, Japan (Uozu, and Tonami) which have been producing large-scale integrated circuits for over 30 years. Areas of process technology focus include high dynamic range image sensors (CIS and CCD), integrated power devices (BCD, SOI and LDMOS) and high frequency silicon RFCMOS. TPSCo offers both IDMs and fabless companies over 120 qualified silicon process flows on 200mm and 300mm substrates from super micron to 45 nm, as well as internal back end processing, assembly and test services.

== See also ==
- Foundry model
- Semiconductor device fabrication
- Science and technology in Israel
- Silicon Wadi
