= Exodus Communications =

American internet services corporation

- Industry: Internet services
- Founded: 1994; 32 years ago
- Founder: BV Jagadeesh, KB Chandrashekar
- Defunct: 2001
- Fate: Chapter 11 bankruptcy; purchased by Cable & Wireless
- Key people: Ellen Hancock

Exodus Communications, the world's largest web hosting provider at the time, was a data center provider that provided retail and commercial server colocation and was an Internet service provider to dot-com businesses. Exodus went public in 1998 amid massive business growth (40% quarterly growth over 13 quarters) and achieved a peak market value of approximately $32 billion US dollars in 2000. Along with many of its customers, Exodus experienced the bursting of the dot-com bubble and declared Chapter 11 bankruptcy in late 2001. Exodus was purchased by Cable and Wireless.

The company created and enabled many "firsts" for the "modern Internet", including the first "storage as a service" cloud service branded as DataVault in partnership with Cisco systems and Sun Microsystems. This was years before Amazon S3 came into existence. The tape backup portion of the DataVault business unit was acquired by Sanrise Inc. Exodus Communications built and operated the first truly global anycast Domain Name System in 1999, using its globally deployed BGP autonomous system.

Exodus acquired American Information Systems, Cohesive, Arca Systems, and Network-1's professional services division. In December 1999, Exodus headed by Ellen Hancock CEO acquired Global OnLine Japan (GOL), Japan's first ISP, launched in 1994 by a Canadian entrepreneur, Roger J. Boisvert together with his wife, Yuriko Hiraguri. Exodus opened its Tokyo IDC in April 2000 together with Nomura Research Institute. In September 2000, the company bought GlobalCenter, Global Crossing's web hosting unit, for $6.5 billion in stock. By the time the deal closed in January 2001, the stock was only worth $1.95 billion.

In January 2003, Cable and Wireless Japan sold Global OnLine Japan to Japanese VoIP operator Fusion Communications, merging its existing consumer Internet and VoIP efforts to create Fusion Network Services. The Fusion group was later acquired by Rakuten Group.

In March 2004, Cable and Wireless America, including the Exodus assets, were acquired by SAVVIS. Cable and Wireless Japan sold its IDC operations to the SoftBank Group in February 2005.
