= Vanguard International Semiconductor Corporation =

Taiwanese semiconductor foundry, subsidiary of TSMC

Coordinates: 24.7749°N 120.9970°E

- Native name: 世界先進積體電路股份有限公司
- Type: Public
- ISIN: TW0005347009
- Industry: Semiconductors
- Founded: December 1994; 31 years ago
- Founder: Morris Chang
- Headquarters: Hsinchu, Taiwan
- Area served: Worldwide
- Number of employees: 6943

Chinese name
- Traditional Chinese: 世界先進積體電路股份有限公司
- Simplified Chinese: 世界先进积体电路股份有限公司
Transcriptions
Standard Mandarin
- Hanyu Pinyin: Shìjiè Xiānjìn Jītǐ Diànlù Gǔfèn Yǒuxiàn Gōngsī
- Website: www.vis.com.tw

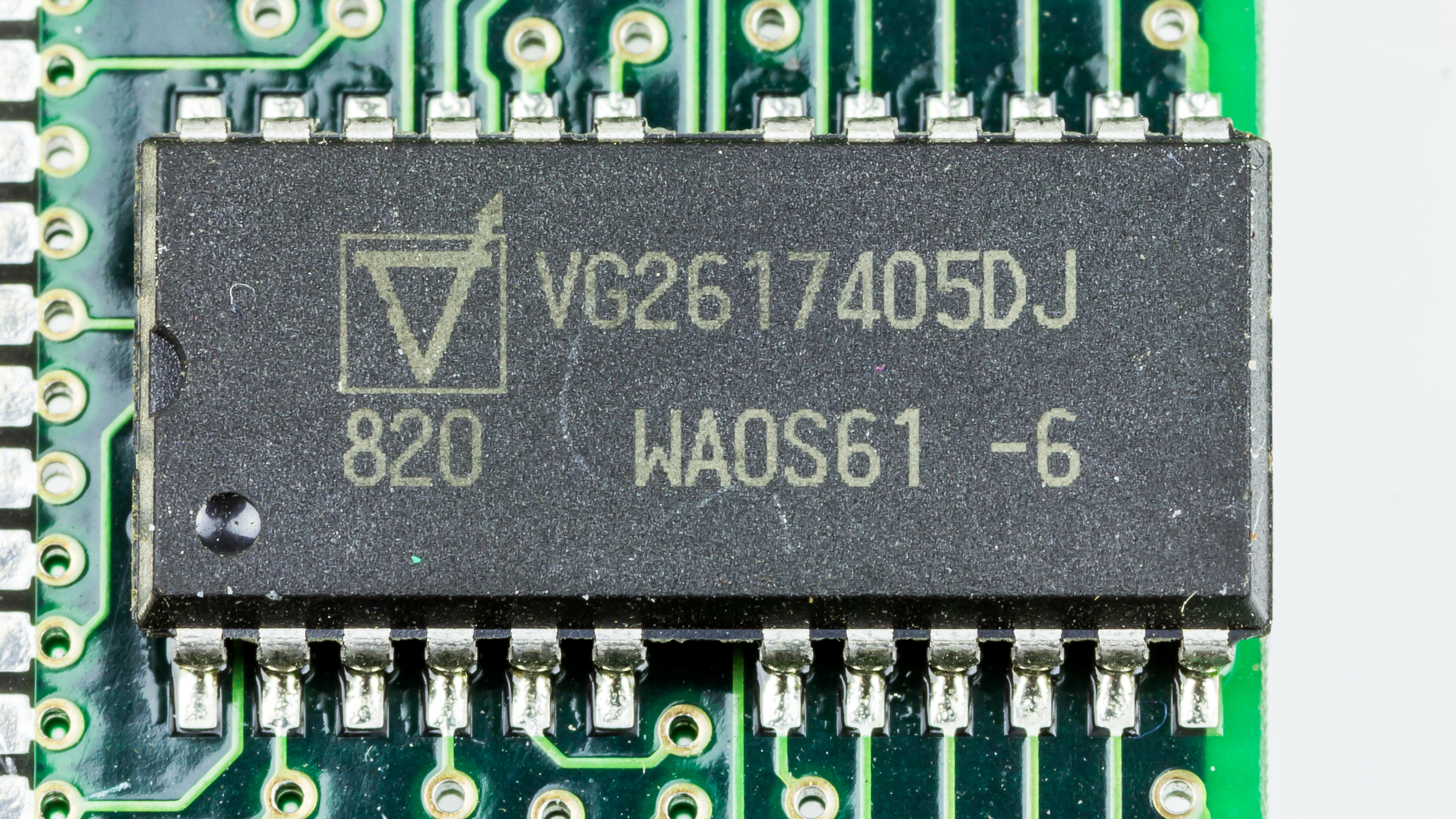
EDO RAM by Vanguard

Vanguard International Semiconductor Corporation (VIS) is a Taiwanese specialized IC foundry service provider, founded in December 1994 in Hsinchu Science Park by Morris Chang. In March 1998, VIS became a listed company on the Taiwan Over-The-Counter Stock-Exchange (OTC) with the main shareholders TSMC, National Development Fund, Executive Yuan and other institutional investors.

== History ==
VIS was working as a subcontractor for TSMC for the manufacturing of logic and mixed signal products, primarily focusing on the production and development of DRAM and other memory IC. In 2000, VIS announced its plan to transform from a DRAM manufacturer into a foundry service provider. As of February 2004, VIS completely terminated its DRAM production and became a pure-play foundry company.

VIS acquired Fab 4 and Fab 5, two lines of 200-mm fab from Winbond Electronics Corp., expanding its production ability. The purchase was finalized in January, 2008.

As of 2018, VIS has a production capacity of approximately 199,000 wafers per month.

VIS purchased GlobalFoundries' Fab 3E located in Tampines, Singapore for $236 million. The transfer of ownership occurred on December 31, 2019. This facility manufactures microelectromechanical systems (MEMS) as well as analog/mixed signal chips. It has a production capacity of around 35,000 200-mm wafer starts per month (WSPM).

VIS is a significant supplier to the automotive industry.

== See also ==
- List of companies of Taiwan
