= Ripcord Networks =

American cryptographic security company

- Industry: voice and video cryptographic security company
- Founded: 2003
- Founder: Alex Fielding
- Headquarters: San Mateo, California
- Key people: Steve Wozniak; John McAfee; Ellen Hancock

Ripcord Networks was a voice and video cryptographic security company. Their headquarters was in San Mateo, California in the United States.

Ripcord Networks was founded in 2003. Board members included: Steve Wozniak, Apple Computer's co-founder; John McAfee, McAfee Antivirus founder; Ellen Hancock, the former CEO of Exodus Communications, former CTO of Apple Computer, and former EVP of IBM. Ripcord's founder and CEO were Alex Fielding and John Adams. The company dissolved in June 2006.
