= Jodi Shelton =

American businesswoman

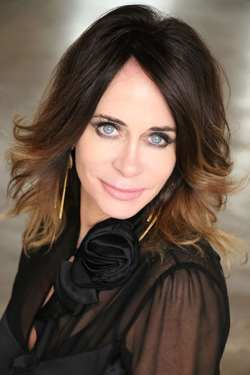
Jodi Shelton, 2013

Jodi Shelton is the co-founder and chief executive officer (CEO) of the Global Semiconductor Alliance (GSA).

In 2018, with the inaugural Rising Women of Influence Award, Shelton launched the GSA Women's Leadership Initiative (WLI). The vision of the Initiative was to significantly increase the number of women in leadership roles in the industry, the capital dedicated to women-led start-ups, and the number of STEM-focused female candidates joining the industry. The Women's Leadership Initiative is led by the Women's Leadership Council. The Council is co-chaired by Vicki Mealer-Burke, Chief Diversity Officer & VP, Human Resources, Qualcomm and Debora Shoquist, Executive VP, Operations, NVIDIA.

Shelton is also founder, president and CEO of the Shelton Group, which was founded in 1994, originally as an investor relations (IR) firm. In 1997, Shelton broadened Shelton Group’s practice to include public relations (PR). The PR division closed in 2013 and restarted in 2019.

== Early career ==
She began her career at Cyrix Corporation. Cyrix was sold to California-based National Semiconductor, which in turn sold it to a Korean concern.

== Global Semiconductor Alliance ==
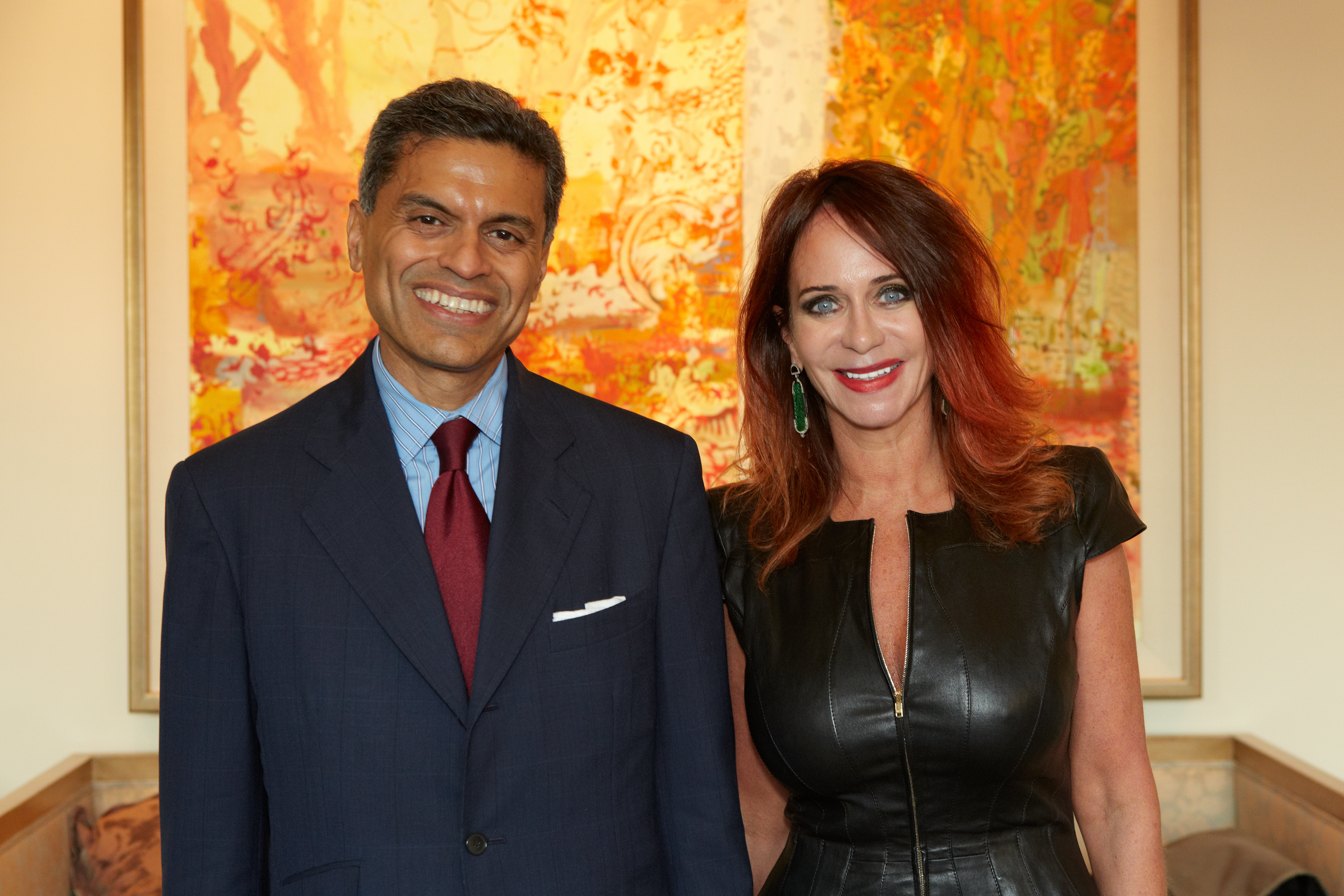
Jodi Shelton and Fareed Zakaria attend GSA's 2014 US Executive Forum in Menlo Park, CA.

Jodi Shelton is the co-founder and CEO of the Global Semiconductor Alliance (GSA), which was founded in 1994 as the Fabless Semiconductor Association. Shelton is also the founder and CEO of Shelton Group.

In her role with GSA, is often a keynote speaker at high-level financial and industry conferences, providing insight on key topics pertaining to the global semiconductor and electronics industries. She was invited to ring the closing bell on NASDAQ in 2006, 2007, 2010 and 2011.

Shelton created the Alliance which consists of 250 corporate members from across the globe.

GSA’s leadership groups, include:

- GSA Board of Directors
- Asia Pacific Leadership Council
- Europe / Middle East / Africa (EMEA) Leadership Council
- Women's Leadership Council
- CxO Councils

== Philanthropic history ==
Shelton is also supportive of several philanthropic organizations, and has served on the board of various organizations.

Shelton has also been involved with the BuildOn organization and has made trips to Haiti with the organization. Learn more about BuildOn and young women benefiting from the organization.

Shelton was one of the founding members of the Yellowstone Club’s Ad-Hoc Committee. The Committee was composed of business leaders who had a personal, vested interest in the Club’s success.

== Jitrois ==
Shelton worked with French leather company Jitrois to open a New York boutique in mid-February 2015 at 959 Madison Avenue. The boutique ceased operations in 4Q 2019.

- PopStyleTV
- Fashion Network.
- Women's Wear Daily

== Personal life ==
Shelton's eyes were the subject of artist Norbert Brunner's piece Eye Object / Magic Mirror displayed in Guerlain, Paris.

Shelton earned her bachelor's degree in political science from San Diego State University, and a master's degree in political science from the University of Houston.
