= Hejian Technology Corporation =

Chinese semiconductor foundry company

Hejian Technology Corporation (Chinese: 和舰科技有限公司) is a Chinese semiconductor foundry company.

== History ==
Hejian was founded in November 2001 as a Wholly Foreign-Owned Enterprise that was registered in the British Virgin Islands. The company began operating in Suzhou. It started production in 2003. They specialize in automotive, consumer, and industrial chips in the range of 0.5 micron to 110 nanometer. Hejian is located in Suzhou Industrial Park. They employ approximately 2,000 workers.

The company was renamed from Hejian Technology (Suzhou) Co. (Chinese: 和舰科技(苏州)有限公司和舰芯片) to Hejian Chip (Chinese: 和舰芯片). Its two biggest customers in 2019 were MediaTek and Tsinghua Unigroup. In 2006, Hejian had US$239 million in revenue and employed around 1,600 people. This made it the third biggest foundry company in China and the 9th biggest in the world.
