= Semiconductor fabrication plant =

Factory where integrated circuits are manufactured

External image
- Photo of the interior of a clean room of a 300mm fab run by TSMC

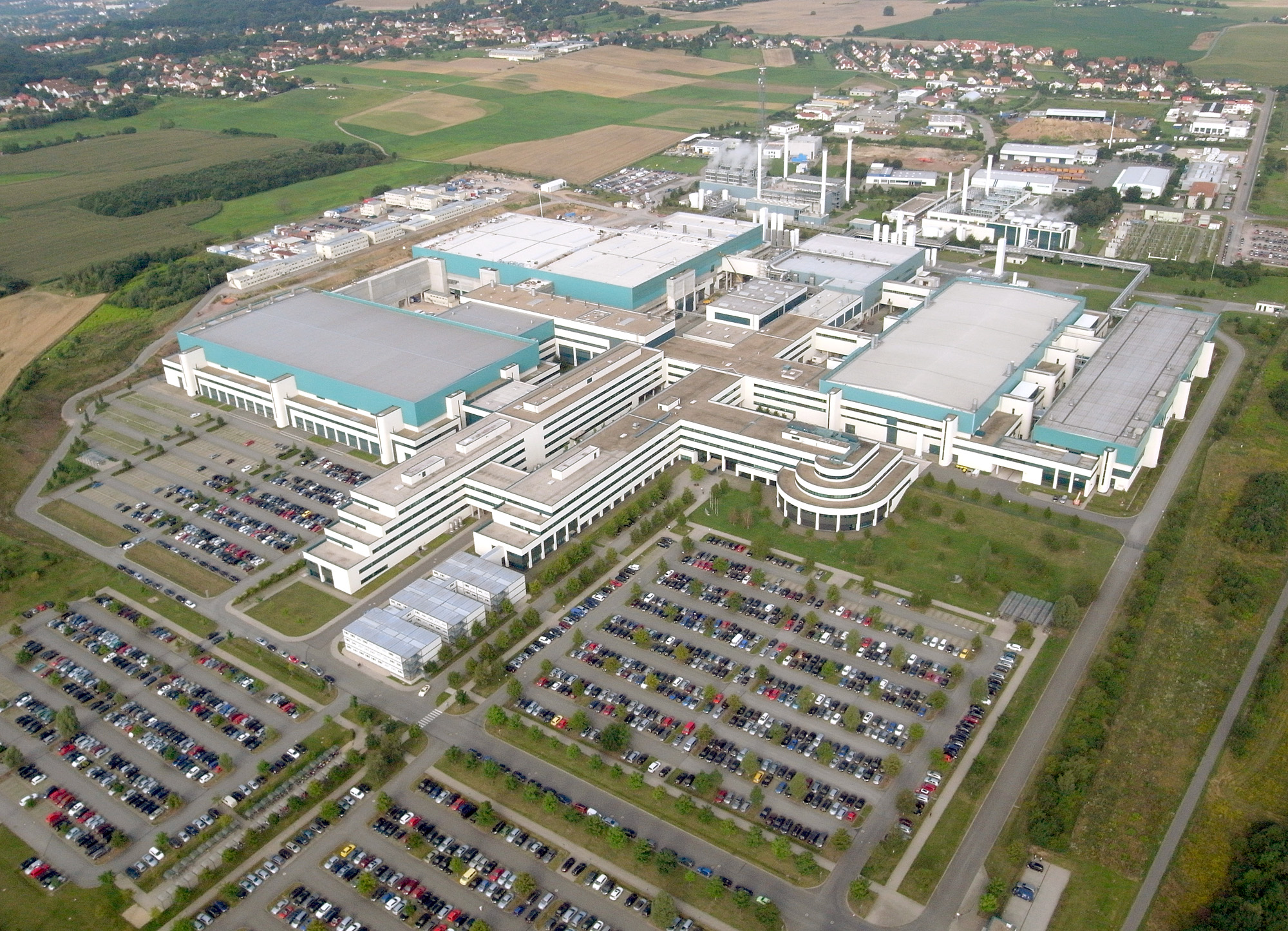
GlobalFoundries Fab 1 in Dresden, Germany. The large rectangles house large cleanrooms.

In the microelectronics industry, a semiconductor fabrication plant, also called a fab or a foundry, is a factory where integrated circuits (ICs) and other semiconductor devices are manufactured. Modern fabs are among the most expensive things built, with costs in the tens of billions of dollars, due to exceedingly high technical and redundancy requirements.

== Design ==
A fab contains one or more cleanroom spaces. The cleanroom is where all fabrication takes place and contains machinery for integrated circuit production such as steppers and/or scanners for photolithography, etching, cleaning, and doping.

In the cleanroom, the environment is controlled to eliminate all dust, since even a single speck can ruin a microcircuit, which has nanoscale features much smaller than dust particles. The clean room must also be damped against vibration to enable nanometer-scale alignment of photolithography machines and must be kept within narrow bands of temperature and humidity. Vibration control may be achieved by using deep piles in the cleanroom's foundation that anchor the cleanroom to the bedrock, careful selection of the construction site, and/or using vibration dampers. Controlling temperature and humidity is critical for minimizing static electricity. Corona discharge sources can also be used to reduce static electricity.

Often, a fab will be constructed in the following manner (from top to bottom): the roof, which may contain air handling equipment that draws, purifies and cools outside air, an air plenum for distributing the air to several floor-mounted fan filter units, which are also part of the cleanroom's ceiling, the cleanroom itself, which may or may not have more than one story, a return air plenum, the clean subfab that may contain support equipment for the machines in the cleanroom such as chemical delivery, purification, recycling and destruction systems, and the ground floor, that may contain electrical equipment. Fabs also often have some office space.

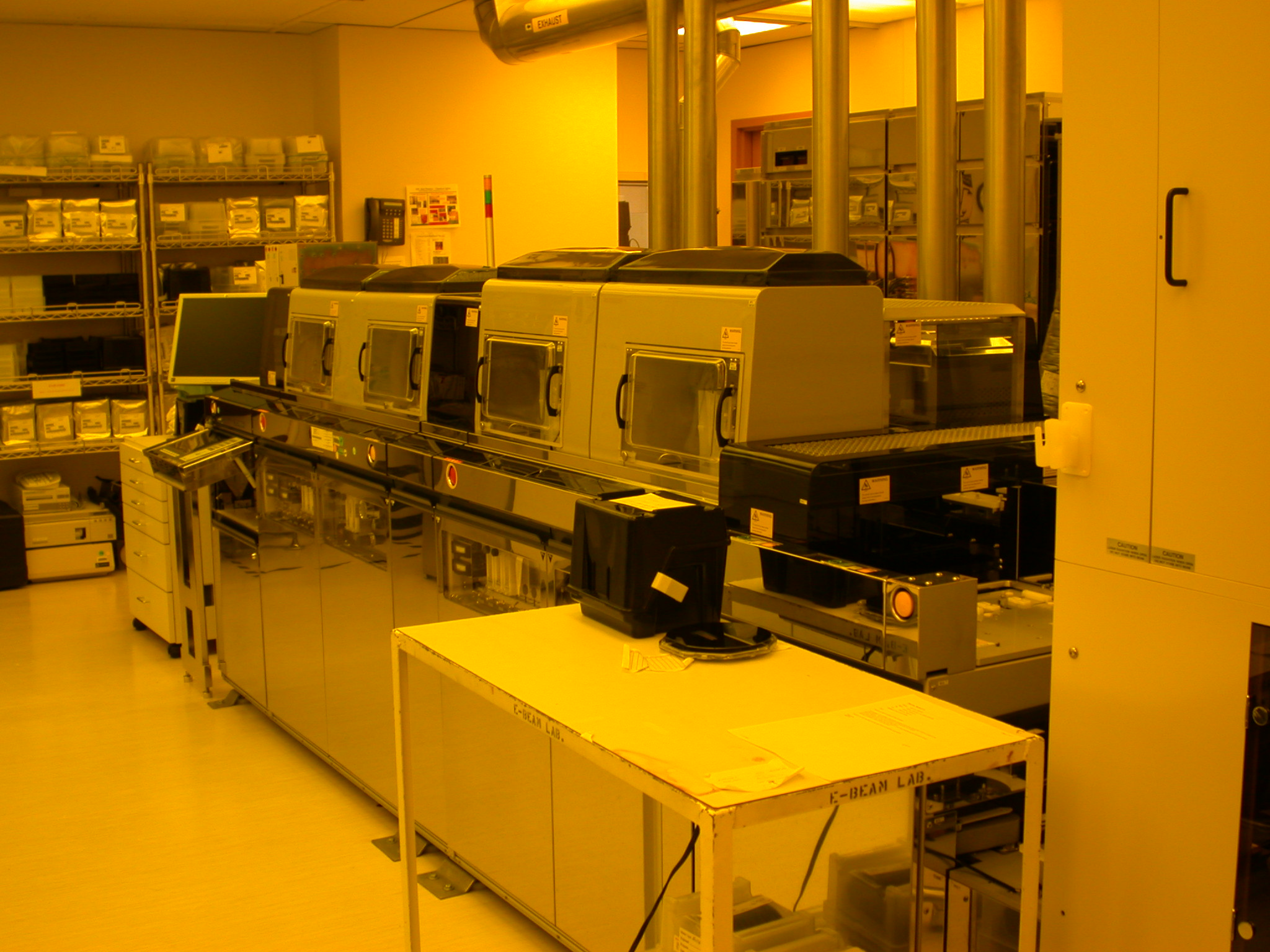
The wafer track portion of an aligner that uses 365 nm ultraviolet light

== History ==
Typically, an advance in chip-making technology requires a completely new fab to be built. In the past, the equipment to outfit a fab was not very expensive and there were a huge number of smaller fabs producing chips in small quantities. However, the cost of the most up-to-date equipment has since grown to the point where a new fab can cost several billion dollars.

Another side effect of the cost has been the challenge to make use of older fabs. For many companies these older fabs are useful for producing designs for unique markets, such as embedded processors, flash memory, and microcontrollers. However, for companies with more limited product lines, it is often best to either rent out the fab, or close it entirely. This is due to the tendency of the cost of upgrading an existing fab to produce devices requiring newer technology to exceed the cost of a completely new fab.

There has been a trend to produce ever larger wafers; each process step is being performed on more and more chips at once. The goal is to spread production costs (chemicals, fab time) over a larger number of sale-able chips. It is impossible (or at least impracticable) to retrofit machinery to handle larger wafers. This is not to say that foundries using smaller wafers are necessarily obsolete; older foundries can be cheaper to operate, have higher yields for simple chips and still be productive.

A foundry model emerged in the 1990s: Companies owning fabs that produced their own designs were known as integrated device manufacturers (IDMs). Companies that outsourced manufacturing of their designs were termed fabless semiconductor companies. Those foundries which did not create their own designs were called pure-play semiconductor foundries.

The industry was aiming to move from the state-of-the-art wafer size 300 mm (12 in) to 450 mm by 2018. In March 2014, Intel expected 450 mm deployment by 2020. But in 2016, corresponding joint research efforts were stopped.

Additionally, there is a large push to completely automate the production of semiconductor chips from beginning to end. This is often referred to as the "lights-out fab" concept.

== Cost ==
Fab prices rise with each generation of chip technology, from costs of around €1.5 billion per fab in the 1990s to between €5 and €20 billion as of 2023. In 2025, TSMC invested over $45 billion into a new fab for their 2 nm process.

Factors that contribute to rising fab costs include:

- The extensive infrastructure required, often in a "subfab" beneath the cleanroom, such as piping, filters and tanks for process gases and ultrapure water, control electronics, power and refrigeration systems.
- Making the cleanroom entirely vibration-free by decoupling it from the building with strong springs, and constructing it without support columns to maximise production space.
- Very expensive production equipment. Prices for individual pieces of equipment for the processing of 300mm wafers range to upwards of $4 million each with a few pieces of equipment reaching as high as $340 million (e.g. EUV scanners). A typical fab will have several hundred equipment items.
- Increasing automation, which becomes increasingly more expensive the more the degree of automation approaches 100%.
- High-purity materials, such as noble gases, hydrogen, oxygen, aqua regia, ultrapure water, and wafers of ultrapure silicon.
- Very high consumption of electricity, heat, water, and cooling, with power needs in the terawatt-hour range per year.
- Multiple redundancy of most systems, to prevent shutdowns which may require weeks or months for the fab to be restarted.

== See also ==
- Foundry model for the business aspects of foundries and fabless companies
- List of semiconductor fabrication plants
- Rock's law
- Semiconductor consolidation
- Semiconductor device fabrication for the process of manufacturing devices
