= List of integrated circuit manufacturers =

The following is an incomplete list of notable integrated circuit (i.e. microchip) manufacturers. Some are in business, others are defunct and some are Fabless.

== 0–9 ==
- 3dfx Interactive (acquired by Nvidia in 2002)

== A ==
- Achronix
- Actions Semiconductor
- Adapteva
- Agere Systems (now part of LSI Logic formerly part of Lucent, which was formerly part of AT&T)
- Agilent Technologies (formerly part of Hewlett-Packard, spun off in 1999)
- Airgo Networks (acquired by Qualcomm in 2006)
- Alcatel
- Alchip
- Altera
- Allwinner Technology
- Alphamosaic (acquired by Broadcom in 2004)
- AMD (Advanced Micro Devices; founded by ex-Fairchild employees)
- Analog Devices
- Apple Inc.
- Applied Materials
- Applied Micro Circuits Corporation (AMCC)
- ARM
- Asahi Kasei Microdevices (AKM)
- AT&T
- Atari
- Atheros (acquired by Qualcomm in 2011)
- ATI Technologies (Array Technologies Incorporated; acquired parts of Tseng Labs in 1997; in 2006, became a wholly owned subsidiary of AMD)
- Atmel (co-founded by ex-Intel employee, now part of Microchip Technology)
- Amkor Technology
- ams AG (formerly known as austriamicrosystems AG and frequently still known as AMS (Austria Mikro Systeme))

== B ==
- Bourns, Inc.
- Brite Semiconductor
- Broadcom Corporation (acquired by Avago Technologies in 2016)
- Broadcom Inc. (formerly Avago Technologies)
- BroadLight
- Burr-Brown Corporation (Acquired by Texas Instruments in 2000)

== C ==
- C-Cube Microsystems
- Calxeda (re-emerged with Silver Lining Systems in 2014)
- Cavium
- CEITEC
- Chips and Technologies (acquired by Intel in 1997)
- CISC Semiconductor
- Cirrus Logic
- Corsair
- Club 3D (Formerly Colour Power)
- Commodore Semiconductor Group (formerly MOS Technologies)
- Conexant (formerly Rockwell Semiconductor, acquired by Synaptics in 2017)
- Crocus Technology
- CSR plc (formerly Cambridge Silicon Radio)
- Cypress Semiconductor Now operating as subsidiary of Infineon Technologies.It was (acquired by Infineon Technologies in 2019).

== D ==
- D-Wave Systems
- Dallas Semiconductor (acquired by Maxim Integrated in 2001)
- Dynex Semiconductor

== E ==
- Elmos Semiconductor
- EM Microelectronic-Marin (subsidiary of The Swatch Group)
- Entropic Communications (acquired by MaxLinear in 2015)
- Epistar
- Epson
- ESS Technology
- Everspin Technologies
- Exar Corporation (established as a subsidiary of Rohm Semiconductor, acquired by MaxLinear in 2017)
- EZchip Semiconductor (acquired by Mellanox Technologies in 2016)

== F ==
- Fagor (owned by Mondragon Corporation)
- Fairchild Semiconductor
- Ferranti
- Freescale Semiconductor (formerly part of Motorola, merged in 2015 with NXP)
- FTDI
- Fujifilm
- Fujitsu

== G ==
- G.Skill
- General Instrument (semiconductor division acquired by Vishay Intertechnology in 2001)
- Genesis Microchip
- GlobalFoundries
- GM Components Holdings
- GMT Microelectronics (formerly Commodore Semiconductor Group)
- GreenPeak Technologies (acquired by Qorvo in 2016)

== H ==
- Harris Semiconductor (acquired by Intersil)
- HannStar Display Corporation
- HiSilicon
- Hitachi, Ltd.
- Holtek

== I ==
- IBM (International Business Machines)
- IM Flash Technologies (founded by Intel Corporation and Micron Technology, Inc.)
- Imagination Technologies (acquired by Canyon Bridge in 2017)
- Infineon Technologies (formerly part of Siemens)
- InfoTM
- Ingenic Semiconductor
- Inmos
- Inprocomm (acquired by MediaTek in 2005)
- Integra Technologies
- International Rectifier (now part of Infineon Technologies since 2015)
- Integrated Device Technology
- Intel (founded by ex-Fairchild employees)
- Intersil (formerly Harris Semiconductor, bought by Renesas in 2017)
- Intrinsity (acquired by Apple Inc. in 2010)
- InvenSense (acquired by TDK in 2016)
- Industrial Technology Research Institute
- IXYS Corporation

== J ==
- Jazz Semiconductor (acquired by Tower Semiconductor in 2008)
- Jennic Limited (acquired by NXP Semiconductors in 2010)

== K ==
- Kawasaki
- Kyocera
- Kingston Technology

== L ==
- Lattice Semiconductor
- Leadcore Technology
- Linear Technology (now under Analog Devices since 2016)
- Littelfuse
- Lantiq (acquired by Intel in 2015)
- LSI Logic (founded by ex-Fairchild employees)

== M ==
- M-Labs (formerly known as the Milkymist project)
- M-Systems (acquired by SanDisk in 2006)
- Macronix
- Magnum Semiconductor (acquired by GigOptix in 2016)
- MaxLinear
- Marvell Technology Group
- MediaTek
- Mellanox Technologies
- Mentor Graphics (subsidiary of Siemens)
- Microchip Technology
- Micron Technology
- Microsemi (acquired by Microchip Technology in 2018)
- MicroSystems International
- Mindspeed Technologies (spun off from Conexant)
- MIPS Technologies (acquired by Imagination Technologies in 2013, Imagination Technologies later sold the company to Tallwood Venture Capital in 2017)
- Mitsubishi Electric
- MOS Technology (founded by Allen-Bradley)
- Mosel Vitelic Corporation (defunct in 2009)
- Mosel Vitelic Inc
- Mostek (founded by ex-Texas Instruments employees)
- Motorola (semiconductor division spun off as Freescale Semiconductor)

== N ==
- National Semiconductor (aka "NatSemi"; founded by ex-Fairchild employees, bought in 2011 by Texas Instruments)
- NEC (semiconductor division merged with Renesas Electronics)
- NetLogic Microsystems (acquired by Broadcom Corporation in 2012)
- Nexperia (spin-off from NXP, founded in 2017)
- Nichia
- Nintendo
- Nordic Semiconductor (formerly known as Nordic VLSI)
- Novellus Systems
- Nvidia (acquired IP of competitor 3dfx in 2000; 3dfx was co-founded by ex-SGI employee)
- NXP Semiconductors (formerly part of Philips)
- Number Nine Visual Technology (acquired by S3 Graphics in 2000)
- Nuvoton (Winbond spun off)

== O ==
- OSRAM
- Oak Technology (acquired by Zoran Corporation in 2003)
- ON Semiconductor (formerly part of Motorola)
- Open-Silicon

== P ==
- Phison
- Parallax Inc.
- Philips Semiconductors (spun off as NXP Semiconductors)
- Plessey
- PLX Technology (acquired by Avago Technologies, now Broadcom Inc.)
- PMC-Sierra (from the former Pacific Microelectronics Centre and Sierra Semiconductor, the latter co-founded by ex-NatSemi employee; now part of Microchip Technology)
- Panasonic (formerly known as Matsushita Electric Industrial Co., Ltd.)
- PortalPlayer (acquired by Nvidia in 2007)
- Powerchip Semiconductor
- Pragmatic Semiconductors
- Precision Monolithics (acquired by Analog Devices in 1990)

== Q ==
- Qualcomm
- Qimonda (split off from Infineon Technologies AG which was formerly part of Siemens)
- Qorvo

== R ==
- Rabbit Semiconductor (acquired by Digi International in 2006)
- Ralink (acquired by MediaTek in 2011)
- Rambus
- RCA
- Realtek
- Renesas Technology (joint venture of Hitachi and Mitsubishi Electric)
- Reticon
- RF Micro Devices (merged with TriQuint Semiconductor to form Qorvo in 2015)
- Ricoh
- Rise Technology (acquired by Silicon Integrated Systems in 1999)
- Robert Bosch
- Rockchip
- Rockwell Semiconductor (spun off as Conexant)
- Rohm
- Roland Corporation
- RMI Corporation (merged into NetLogic Microsystems, then Broadcom)

== S ==
- Samsung Electronics (Semiconductor division)
- Sanyo (Semiconductor division sold off to ON Semiconductor in 2010)
- SanDisk (acquired by Western Digital in 2016)
- Seagate Technology
- Sensonor (acquired by Infineon Technologies in 2012)
- Sharp Corporation (Sharp Semiconductor division)
- SiFive
- Signetics (acquired by Philips (now NXP) in 1975)
- Sigma Designs
- SigmaTel (acquired by Freescale which merged with NXP in 2015)
- Silicon Motion
- Silicon Systems (now part of Western Digital)
- Silicon Labs
- Silicon Image (acquired by Lattice Semiconductor in 2015)
- Silicon Integrated Systems
- SK Hynix
- Skyworks Solutions (spun-off from Conexant)
- Sony (Semiconductor division)
- SMIC
- Spansion
- Spreadtrum
- STMicroelectronics (formerly SGS Thomson)
- ST-Ericsson (defunct in 2013)
- Sun Microsystems (acquired by Oracle Corporation in 2010)
- Symbios Logic (sold to Hyundai Electronics in 1995)
- Synertek

== T ==
- Tamarack Microelectronics (merged with IC Plus in 2002)
- TDK
- Telechips
- Tektronix (semiconductor division sold to Maxim Integrated in 1994)
- Teridian Semiconductor
- Texas Instruments
- Tilera (acquired by EZchip Semiconductor, EZchip was later acquired by Mellanox Technologies)
- Toshiba
- Tower Semiconductor
- Transmeta (acquired by Novafora in 2009)
- TriQuint Semiconductor (merged with RF Micro Devices to form Qorvo in 2015)
- Truly International Holdings
- Trumpf
- TSMC (Taiwan Semiconductor Manufacturing Company. semiconductor foundry)

== U ==
- UMC (company)
- u-blox
- Ubicom (formerly Scenix Semiconductor, acquired by Qualcomm Atheros in 2012)

== V ==
- Vanguard International Semiconductor Corporation
- VIA Technologies (founded by ex-Intel employee, part of Formosa Plastics Group)
- Vimicro
- Virata Corporation (merged with Conexant in 2004)
- Vishay Intertechnology
- Vivante Corporation
- Volterra Semiconductor

== W ==
- Wacom
- Western Digital
- Wilocity (acquired by Qualcomm Atheros in 2014)
- Winbond
- Wolfson Microelectronics
- WonderMedia

== X ==
- X-Fab
- Xelerated (acquired by Marvell Technology Group in 2012)
- Xilinx (founded by ex-ZiLOG employee)
- XMOS

== Y ==
- Yamaha Corporation

== Z ==
- ZiLOG (founded by ex-Intel employees, part of Exxon 1980–89; now owned by TPG)
- Zoran Corporation (merged with CSR (company) PLC which was later merged to Qualcomm)

== See also ==
- List of countries by integrated circuit exports
- List of system on a chip suppliers
