= List of system on a chip suppliers =

The following is a list of system-on-a-chip suppliers.

- Actions Semiconductor
- Advanced Micro Devices (AMD)
- Advanced Semiconductor Engineering (ASE)
- Alchip
- Allwinner Technology
- Altera
- Amkor Technology
- Amlogic
- Analog Devices
- Apple Inc.
- Applied Micro Circuits Corporation (AMCC)
- ARM Holdings
- ASIX Electronics
- Atheros
- Axis Communications
- Broadcom
- Cambridge Silicon Radio
- Cavium Networks
- CEVA, Inc.
- Cirrus Logic
- Conexant
- Cortina Systems
- Cypress Semiconductor
- Espressif
- Freescale Semiconductor
- Fujifilm
- HiSilicon
- Imagination Technologies
- Infineon Technologies
- Integra Technologies
- Intel Corporation
- InvenSense
- Lattice Semiconductor
- Leadcore Technology
- LSI Corporation
- M-Labs
- Marvell Technology Group
- Maxim Integrated Products
- MediaTek
- Microchip Technology
- MIPS Technologies
- MStar Semiconductor
- Nokia
- Nordic Semiconductor
- NVIDIA
- NXP Semiconductors (formerly Philips Semiconductors)
- Open-Silicon
- Qualcomm
- Redpine Signals
- Renesas
- Rockchip
- Ruselectronics
- Samsung Exynos
- Sharp
- Sigma Designs
- SigmaTel
- Silicon Integrated Systems
- Silicon Motion
- Skyworks Solutions
- Socionext
- SolidRun
- Spreadtrum
- STMicroelectronics
- ST-Ericsson
- Telechips
- Tensilica
- Teridian Semiconductor
- Texas Instruments
- Transmeta
- Vimicro
- Virage Logic
- WonderMedia
- Xilinx
- Zoran Corporation

== See also ==
- List of countries by integrated circuit exports
- List of integrated circuit manufacturers
- List of semiconductor companies by country
