= Integra Technologies =

American semiconductor company

- Company type: Private
- Industry: Semiconductors & related devices
- Founded: 1983 NCR CETC; 1998 Integra Technologies; 2005 Integra Technologies
- Headquarters: Wichita
- Number of locations: 2 (Wichita & Milpitas)
- Key people: Brett Robinson, President & CEO
- Services: IC Testing & Packaging
- Number of employees: almost 500 (2023)
- Website: integra-tech.com

Integra Technologies is an Outsourced Semiconductor Assembly And Test (OSAT) post processing provider headquartered in Wichita, Kansas, United States. Its current facilities are located in Wichita and Milpitas, California (within Silicon Valley). Their service converts final semiconductor wafers into useable packaged integrated circuits.

After semiconductor companies fabricate wafers at semiconductor fabrication plants (fab / foundry), their final wafers are sent to post processing facilities to cut the wafers into "dice" then encapsulate them into integrated circuit (IC) packages, a format that allows other companies to solder the ICs on to printed circuit boards (PCB). Integra Technologies provides post processing services for wafer testing, wafer backgrinding, wafer preparation, wafer dicing, integrated circuit (IC) packaging, IC testing, reliability and qualification testing, counterfeit detection, and related services.

Integra is an accredited supplier recommended by the Defense Microelectronics Activity (DMEA) laboratory for post processing of ICs for use by Department of Defense (DoD) programs (such as Trusted Foundry Program). It has provided services for more than 100 DoD programs, and various space applications including the Mars rover, Hubble Space Telescope, Orion (spacecraft).

== History ==
- 1983 - NCR founded their CETC (Component Evaluation Technology Center) group.
- 1991 - AT&T acquired NCR, then CETC becomes part of Bell Labs.
- 1996 - AT&T underwent a court ordered trivestiture by splitting into three independent companies: AT&T, NCR, Lucent. AT&T spun off Bell Labs and CETC into Lucent Technologies.
- 1998 - Lucent spun off CETC into the new company named Integra Technologies.
- 2000 - Amkor Technology acquired Integra Technologies.
- 2005 - Amkor spun off Integra Technologies, again.
- 2008 - Integra becomes employee owned.
- 2013 - Integra acquired Analytical Solutions Incorporated (ASI) in Albuquerque, New Mexico next to Kirtland Air Force Base near Sandia National Laboratories. It provided failure analysis, construction analysis, destructive physical analysis, non-destructive testing, and counterfeit investigation of semiconductor devices.
- 2017 - Integra acquired CORWIL Technology based in Milpitas, California. It was founded in 1990 to provide IC assembly and test services.
- 2019 - Integra announced it moved its corporate offices into a new 14,000 sq ft facility in Wichita, and will house administrative, sales, and support staff.
- 2021 - Integra opened a 2,700 square foot lab expansion housing 15 new pieces of specialized test equipment.
- 2022 - The Integra Albuquerque facility (previously Analytical Solutions) was moved to its Wichita facilities.
- 2022 - Integra acquired Presto Engineering test assets.
- 2023 - Integra proposes a $1.8 billion total capital investment for a one million square foot IC assembly & test facility and headquarters in the Wichita metro area that would provide at least 2000 new jobs. Integra would receive $304.2 million in public incentives from Kansas. Most of the funds would comes from the federal CHIPS and Science Act to boost domestic manufacturing of semiconductors in the United States. The proposed site would be located at the southeast corner of K-254 highway and Rock Road in Bel Aire, a suburb northeast of Wichita.
- 2023 - Integra announced they will be opening a training center at 3718 N. Rock Road in Wichita, also it will serve as their interim headquarters until the new large building is completed.
- 2025 - Micross acquired Integra Technologies.

== Facilities ==
The following is a list of Integra's current facilities:

- 3718 N. Rock Rd in Wichita, Kansas - soon to be training center and interim headquarters
- 3450 N. Rock Rd in Wichita, Kansas
- 1635 McCarthy Blvd in Milpitas, California (within Silicon Valley)

Proposed future facility:

- K-254 highway and Rock Rd in Bel Aire, Kansas - future 1,000,000 square feet (93,000 m^{2}) facility & headquarters, construction not started yet

== See also ==
- Semiconductor industry
- Semiconductor device fabrication
- Integrated circuit packaging
- Fabless manufacturing
