= Dicing saw =

Precision saw used to cut semiconductor wafers and other electronic materials

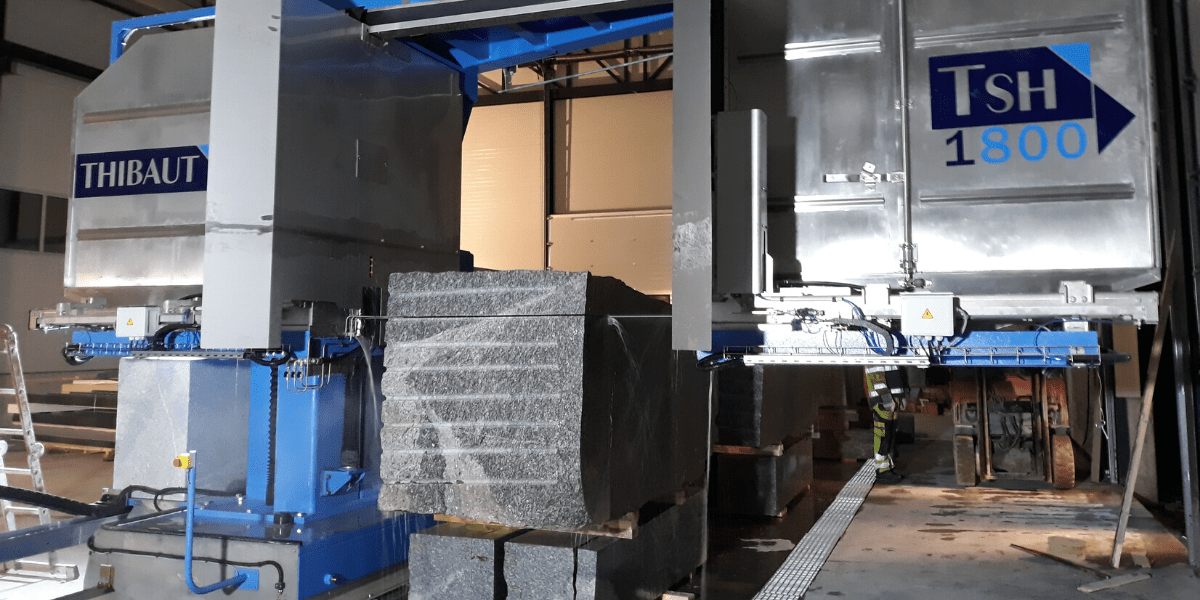
Diamond wire saw in stone industry

A dicing saw is a kind of saw which employs a high-speed spindle fitted with an extremely thin diamond blade or diamond wire to dice, cut, or groove semiconductor wafers, and glass, ceramic, crystal, and many other types of material.

The thickness of the cutting blades used varies with the material being cut, and is of about 20 μm to 35 μm when cutting silicon wafers. Japanese companies, such as DISCO Corporation and Accretech (Tokyo Seimitsu), account for about 90% of dicing saw sales. In the past, cutting 1/2 to 2/3 of wafer thickness was the mainstream; with large diameter wafers on dicing tape, full cut cutting is becoming mainstream.

== See also ==
- Diamond tools
- Disco Corporation – a manufacturer of dicing saws
