= Volker Kempe =

German scientist, manager and entrepreneur

- Born: July 1, 1939 (age 87); Berlin,
- Education: Dresden University of Technology
- Occupations: Scientist, Manager, Entrepreneur
- Employer(s): German Academy of Sciences at Berlin, ams AG, SensorDynamics

Volker Kempe (born 1 July 1939) is a German scientist, manager and entrepreneur.

== Background ==
1957–1963: studied physics and communication science at the Moscow Energetic Institute, Diploma with distinction; 1968: received PhD degree (Dr.-Ing.), summa cum laude, from the Dresden University of Technology; 1976: received PhD degree (Dr.sc.nat.) for his work on the theory of stochastic systems (two books); 1978: received the title professor of information and control theory from the German Academy of Sciences at Berlin; 1984: elected corresponding member of the Academy of Sciences of the GDR, in 1986 elected full member of the academy; 1988: elected full member of the International Academy of Astronautics

== Career ==
From 1977 to 1990 he led the Institute of Cybernetics and Information Processes at the German Academy of Sciences at Berlin with over 600 employees. Moving to the microelectronic industry, he led the Engineering Department of ams AG and later the Strategic Product Development from 1990 to 2003, and in 2003 co-founded SensorDynamics AG, an Austrian semiconductor company, where is vice president of R&D that focused on innovative sensor solutions for high volume applications in automotive and industry. He has authored over 100 papers and more than 20 patents, four books and five scientific anthologies, as well as four journals and book series. He has been in the program committee of several major international conferences, like ESSCIRC and DTIP. His work has been recognized twice with the National Prize of the GDR (major award given for outstanding creative work in the fields of science and technology).

== Citations ==
Letter of Prof. Volker Kempe to Erich Honecker, 1986: „Computers produced in the German Democratic Republic are worryingly lagging behind in quantity, power, price and software.”

Article in the newspaper Neues Deutschland from February 7, 1985, p. 3: „Thanks and best wishes for further success ... the warmest congratulations on the 35th anniversary of the formation of the Ministry for State Security combined with best wishes for further great successes in your responsible work ...”
