= Silergy =

Chinese semiconductor company

Silergy Corp.
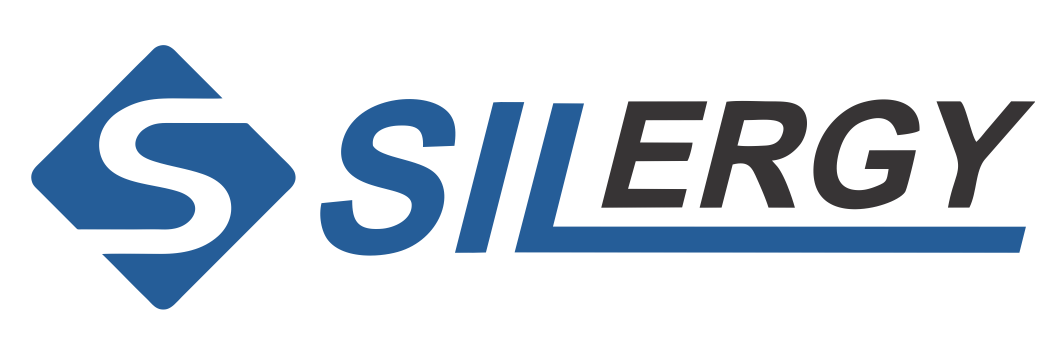
- Native name: 矽力杰股份有限公司
- Type: Public
- Traded as: TWSE: 6415
- Industry: Semiconductors
- Founded: 7 February 2008; 18 years ago
- Founders: Chen Wei; You Budong; Michael Grimm
- Headquarters: Hangzhou, Zhejiang, China
- Key people: Chen Wei (Chairman); You Budong (Co-CEO)
- Revenue: ▼NT$ 15.43 billion (2023)
- Net income: ▼NT$ 637.05 million (2023)
- Total assets: ▼NT$ 34.42 billion (2023)
- Total equity: ▲NT$ 31.54 billion (2023)
- Number of employees: 1,720 (2023)
- Website: www.silergy.com

Silergy (Chinese: 矽力; pinyin: Xì Lì) is a multinational semiconductor company incorporated in the Cayman Islands and publicly listed on the Taiwan Stock Exchange. Its headquarters is in Hangzhou, Zhejiang, and it operates 30 locations in 10 countries, including a technology headquarters in Santa Clara, California The company manufactures power management integrated circuits (PMICs).

== Background ==
Silergy was founded in February 2008 by several Silicon Valley veterans. Silergy was originally founded Santa Clara, California but due to the 2008 financial crisis, another office was set up in Hangzhou to take advantage of China's domestic demand.

At the time the PMIC market share was dominated by American and European manufacturers such as Texas Instruments, Qualcomm and Infineon Technologies. The goal was the company was to create a Chinese equivalent of Texas Instruments that could break the monopoly. Silergy adopts a "virtual IDM" model that requires cooperation with wafer foundries resulting in a single chip that can integrate multiple functions.

In December 2013, Silergy held its initial public offering becoming a listed company on the Taiwan Stock Exchange. One of the advantages of being listed in Taiwan was Silergy did not need to be secretive and could recruit talent from Taiwan openly.

Silergy has made multiple acquisitions to expand the scale of its operations. In 2016, it acquired smart meter and energy monitoring business (including Teridian Semiconductor) from Maxim Integrated for US$105 million.

On 29 January 2018,Reuters reported "Silergy says unit to buy property in Xi'an for 41.6 mln yuan"

On 5 April 2021, Silergy continued to grow rapidly, with revenues surpassing $1 billion in 2020.

In April 2023, Silergy leased a 27,700 square foot office in Santa Clara, CA, for its US Technology headquarters, previously located in a 5,000 square foot office in Sunnyvale, CA.

In the first quarter of 2024, Silergy finally returned to positive growth after experiencing six-quarters of decline due to a weak China market as well as price pressure. The next market it planned to focus on is the green energy industry.

== See also ==
- Teridian Semiconductor
- Texas Instruments
- Semiconductor industry in China
