= Silicon Systems =

American semiconductor company

Silicon Systems Inc.
- Industry: Electronics
- Founded: May 17, 1972; 54 years ago
- Founders: Gene B. Potter; Ronald H. Reeder; William E. Drobish
- Defunct: 1996
- Fate: Company split up by parent with storage products portion acquired by Texas Instruments and communications products business retained as TDK Semiconductor Corporation
- Successor: Teridian Semiconductor
- Headquarters: Tustin, California
- Revenue: US$400 million (1996)
- Number of employees: 146 (1980)
- Parent: TDK Corporation (from 1989)

Silicon Systems Inc. (SSi) (not to be confused with SiliconSystems, Inc.) was an American semiconductor company based in Tustin, California. The company manufactured mixed-signal integrated circuits and semiconductors for telecommunications and data storage.

== Company history ==
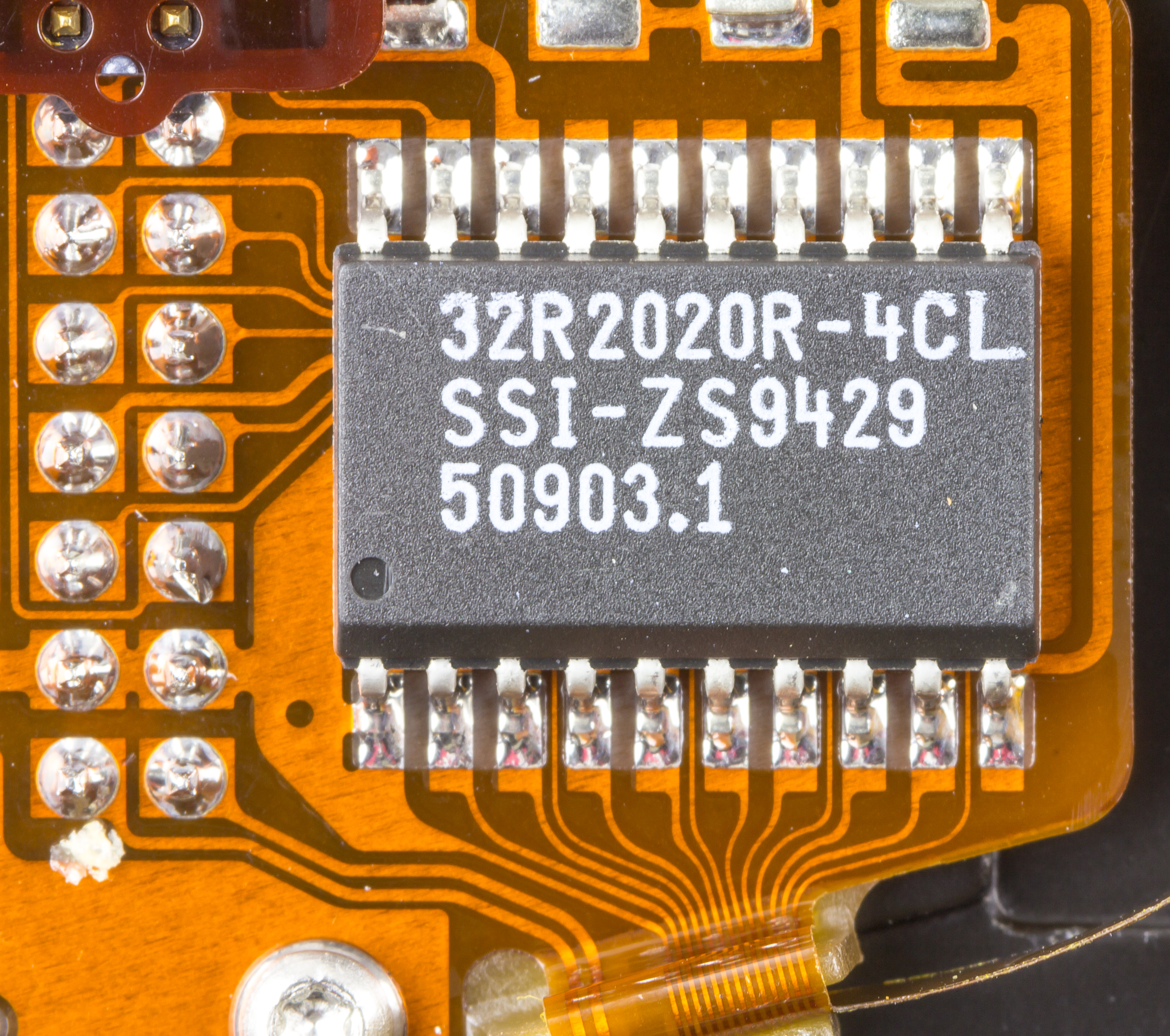
2, 4, 6, 10-Channel Thin-Film Read/Write Device

Silicon Systems was founded and incorporated in California on May 17, 1972 by Gene B. Potter, Ronald H. Reeder, and William E. Drobish. SSi grew to 146 employees and $10.5 million in revenue in 1980. Its initial public offering was on January 29, 1981. The company became a supplier of integrated circuits (ICs) for computer disk drives, touch-tone receivers, vehicle loop detectors, and other applications from garage door openers to descrambling satellite broadcast signals.

The company was acquired by TDK Corporation in on May 15, 1989 for $200M.

The company grew to an annual revenue of $400 million as of 1996. It owned wafer fabrication plants in Tustin and Santa Cruz, California, an assembly and test facility in Singapore, and design facilities in San Jose and Grass Valley, California. In 1996, Texas Instruments (TI) acquired the storage products portion of SSi in a deal worth $575 million. TDK retained the communications products business as TDK Semiconductor Corporation (TSC).

In 2005, TSC was purchased by Golden Gate Capital Partners and renamed Teridian Semiconductor.

In 2010, Teridian was purchased by Maxim Integrated Products for $315M in cash.

The Teridian energy measurement products group was then sold to Silergy on March 18, 2016.

The founders of Silicon Systems came from Scientific Data Systems.

MicroSim Corporation spun off from Silicon Systems in 1984. In 1998 MicroSim was acquired by OrCAD Systems Corporation.

Silicon Systems Inc. had no relation to another and more recent company named SiliconSystems, Inc. which was founded in 2003, made solid-state drives (SSDs), and was eventually acquired by Western Digital.

== Early designs ==
=== Designs for integrated circuit houses ===
- 256-bit and 1024-bit ECL RAM for Signetics
- bipolar test chip for Scientific Micro systems
- Interface Vector Byte (SMS360) for Scientific Micro systems SMS300 microcontroller series which later became the Signetics 8X300
- second source Transistor–transistor logic designs for Advanced Micro Devices

8-bit addressable latch (Silicon Systems first chip completed)
8-bit parallel output shift register
synchronous 4-bit up/down counter

- 8288 bus controller for Intel

=== Designs for end users, with SSi supplying the completed circuits ===
- digital loop detector for Indicator Controls Corporation

the first fully integrated traffic detector
the first chip checked with SSi's proprietary rules checking software

- 5 chips for Hughes Aircraft Company, Culver City
- digital video processor for Hughes Aircraft Company, Canoga Park
- S14001A speech synthesis chip for the Speech+ Calculator of Telesensory Systems
- video editing time code generator for EECO, Inc. (Electronic Engineering Company of California)
- output interface chip for Telesensory Systems Opticon reader for the blind
- garage door opener digital transmitter and receiver chips for Linear Corporation
- VLA1 and VLA2 correlator chips for Very Large Array of the National Radio Observatory
- barricade flasher controller chip for Royal Industries, Inc.
- DC011 and DC012 integrated electronics for Digital Equipment Corporation VT100 computer terminal
- digital loop detector (second generation) for Detector Systems, Inc.
- SC-01 speech synthesis chip implementing vocal tract model for Votrax Division of Federal Screw Works

=== Designs proprietary to SSi ===
- SSi 101 servo preamplifier for hard disk drives
- SSi 104/105 4 channel read/write head interface for hard disk drives
- SSi 201 Dual-tone multi-frequency signaling DTMF receiver for telephony

the first fully integrated DTMF receiver implemented with switched capacitor filters

== Early employees ==
Early employees of Silicon Systems included:

- Gene Potter, July 1972
- Ron Reeder, January 1973
- Bill Drobish, February 1973
- Curly Adams, February 1973
- Mike Morley, March 1973
- Robert Amneus, April 1973
- Edward Bernard, May 1973
- Dick Yamasaki, September 1973
- Marty Jurick, September 1973
- Grant Shatto, September 26, 1973
- Ed Klein, January 1974
- Bin Yang, March 1974
- Mike Wimbrow, September 1974
- Martin Harvey, March 1976
- Chuck Austin, August 1976
- Mike Taggart, September 1976
- Bert White, December 1976
- Jim Kellis, January 1977
- Dick Yamasaki, September 1977
- Wolfram Blume, November 1977
- Steve Griggs, May 1978
- Marcia McReynolds, June 1979
- Dave Goff, September 1979
- Charles Bourgeois, December 1980
- Rhona Jordan, 1980
- Tim Hyde, 1980
- Jill de Guzman, January 1981
- Katherine Downing, 1981
- Brett Jeisy, December 1981
- Cody Campbell, 1982
- Sabrina Lee, 1985

== Locations ==
- February 1973 to December 1976: 2913 Daimler St., Santa Ana, CA
- December 1976 to April 1979: 16692 Hale Ave., Irvine, CA
- October 1977 to April 1979: Gary Ave., Irvine, CA - Design Engineering and Personnel
- May 1978 to April 1979: 16832 Red Hill Ave., Irvine, CA - Advanced Development
- April 1979 onward: 14351 Myford Rd., Tustin, CA
