= SiFive =

Fabless semiconductor company providing RISC-V processors

SiFive, Inc.
- Type: Private
- Industry: Semiconductors
- Founded: September 2015; 11 years ago
- Founders: Krste Asanović; Yunsup Lee; Andrew Waterman
- Headquarters: Santa Clara, California, U.S.
- Key people: Patrick Little (CEO)
- Revenue: US$38.1 million (2023)
- Operating income: US$−113 million (2023)
- Number of employees: c. 500 (2023)
- Website: sifive.com

SiFive, Inc. is an American fabless semiconductor IP company and provider of commercial RISC-V processors and silicon chips based on the RISC-V instruction set architecture (ISA). Its products include cores, SoCs, IPs, and development boards.

SiFive was one of the first companies to produce a chip that implemented the RISC-V ISA.

SiFive has a valuation of approximately $3.65 billion and has raised $766 million in funding from investors including Spark Capital, Sutter Hill Ventures, and Coatue.

== History ==
In 2015, researchers Krste Asanović, Yunsup Lee, and Andrew Waterman from the University of California, Berkeley founded SiFive. On November 29, 2016, SiFive released the Freedom Everywhere 310 SoC and the HiFive development board. This made it the first company to produce a chip that implemented the RISC-V ISA, although some universities had already produced RISC-V processors.

Naveed Sherwani was appointed CEO in August 2017. In October 2017, SiFive did a limited release of its U54-MC, which was reported to be the first RISC-V-based 64-bit quad-core CPU that supported comprehensive operating systems like Linux.

In June 2018, SiFive acquired Open-Silicon for an undisclosed amount and retained its application-specific integrated circuit (ASIC) design capabilities.

In February 2018, SiFive released the HiFive Unleashed, a development board containing a 64-bit SoC with four U54 cores.

In September 2020, Patrick Little was appointed CEO.

In October 2020, SiFive released the HiFive Unmatched, a Mini-ITX development board with four U74-MC cores, one S7 core, 8GB DDR4 RAM, four USB 3.2 Gen1 ports, one PCI Express x16 slot, one PCIe Gen3 x4, one microSD card slot, and Gigabit Ethernet. In April 2021, the company also taped out its first system-on-chip on TSMC's N5 process technology, making it the first RISC-V-based device to be made using a 5 nm node.

In June 2021, Canonical announced its Ubuntu operating system's support for the HiFive Unmatched and HiFive Unleashed, and the Barcelona Supercomputing Center collaborated with Codeplay Software and SiFive to implement support for the RISC-V V-extension v0.10 in the LLVM compilation infrastructure, providing vector computation capabilities through C/C++ intrinsics.

In summer 2021, reports of a potential buyout of SiFive by Intel and other companies emerged. Intel's plans were eventually cancelled due to disagreement with SiFive.

In 2023, it was reported that SiFive had laid off 20% of its staff.

SiFive was the main sponsor of Cambridge United F.C. for the 2022/23 and the 2023/24 seasons.

== Business development ==
In September 2015, SiFive raised $5 million in Series A funding. In May 2017, SiFive raised $8.5 million in Series B.

In April 2018, SiFive received $50.6 million Series C funding, including a major amount from Intel Capital.

In June 2019, SiFive received $65.4 million in a Series D funding round led by existing investors Sutter Hill Ventures, Chengwei Capital, Spark Capital, Osage University Partners, and Huami, alongside new investor Qualcomm Ventures. This brought the total investment in SiFive to $125 million.

On October 23, 2019, at the Linley Fall Processor Conference, SiFive announced the release of SiFive Shield, a platform security architecture. In December 2019, the company announced the SiFive Apex cores for mission-critical markets and SiFive Intelligence cores for vector processing workloads. Later that month, Samsung also announced it would be using SiFive RISC-V cores for SoCs, automotive, and 5G applications.

In January 2020, SiFive hired Chris Lattner, an American software engineer best known as the main author of LLVM and related projects such as the Clang compiler and the Swift programming language. He joined SiFive as Senior Vice President of Platform Engineering after two years at Google.

In August 2020, SiFive received $60 million in a Series E funding round led by investors SK Hynix and Saudi Aramco. This brought the total investment in SiFive to $186 million. That same month, SiFive announced the creation of the OpenFive business unit to focus on the creation of processor-agnostic custom SoC design.

Chip company Tenstorrent, headed by former top AMD engineers, including CTO Jim Keller, licensed SiFive's Intelligence X280 processor cores in October 2020 into its homegrown AI training and inference chips. Renesas Electronics also announced partnering with SiFive to design chips for vehicles.

In June 2021, SiFive launched a new processor family with two core designs: P270, a Linux-capable CPU; and P550, the highest-performing RISC-V CPU. At the same time, Intel's Foundry Service adopted P550 for use in its Horse Creek platform, a RISC-V development platform built on Intel's newest 7 nm process node, Intel 4. The announcement furthered speculation of a potential acquisition of SiFive by Intel, which reportedly offered to acquire SiFive for $2 billion.

As part of SiFive's “relentless innovation” program, the company announced the SiFive 21G2 update for the SiFive Essential family, including 11% faster U74 cores.

In March 2022, SiFive received $175 million in a Series F funding round led by Coatue Management, valuing the company at over $2.5 billion. This brought the total investment in SiFive to over $350 million.

In March 2022, Alphawave IP Group plc acquired SiFive's OpenFive business unit for $210 million. As part of the transaction, Alphawave also licensed RISC-V processor intellectual property from SiFive.

In October 2023, SiFive laid off approximately 20% (~140) of its 650 employees. SiFive reiterated its commitment to existing products and lines and stated that the company is "well funded for years in the future and will continue to work".

On April 9, 2026, SiFive announced it had raised $400 million in a Series G funding round led by Atreides Management, valuing the company at $3.65 billion. The financing, which included participation from NVIDIA and Apollo Global Management, was described by the company as its final private round before a potential initial public offering.

== Products ==
The company is among the earliest commercial providers of RISC-V hardware. Its technology has been used in a variety of applications, including NASA's future spaceflight computing platform. The company operates on a licensing and royalty business model, competing primarily with proprietary architectures such as ARM.

- RISC-V cores: SiFive core series – SiFive provides a range of 32-bit and 64-bit designs across four primary categories: high-performance application cores (Performance), machine learning vector processors (Intelligence), safety-certified automotive cores (Automotive), and area-optimized embedded processors (Essential).
- SoC IP – The SoC IP is customizable, or customers can choose from memory interface IP, connectivity IP, or system and peripheral IP.
- Custom SoC – Starting with an SoC template, users can create custom SoC designs to be optimized for power, performance, and area.
- Boards and software – SiFive develops RISC-V development boards, including the HiFive Premier P550 and HiFive Unmatched Rev B. Previously developed and now discontinued products include the FE310 microcontroller, HiFive1, HiFive Unleashed, the original HiFive Unmatched, and other development boards and related software.

== DesignShare platform ==
DesignShare was an open-source platform for building prototypes. SiFive partnered with vendors to provide IP to customers designing custom chip prototypes without paying IP fees in advance. Once chip designs were ready for mass production, customers would pay for the IP. DesignShare partners included Brite Semiconductor, Rambus, Chipus Microelectronics, and more.
