= SensorDynamics =

European semiconductor and MEMS company

- Type: Private
- Industry: Semiconductors
- Founded: Graz, Austria (2003)
- Successor: Maxim Integrated GmbH
- Headquarters: Graz, Austria
- Key people: Hubertus Christ (Founder); Herbert Gartner (Founder); Volker Kempe (Founder); Jürgen Tittel (Founder)
- Products: Sensor & Sensor Interfaces, Semiconductors, MEMS
- Owner: Maxim Integrated
- Website: www.sensordynamics.cc

SensorDynamics was a European semiconductor and MEMS company specialized in developing and manufacturing high-volume micro- and Wireless semiconductor sensor products for applications in automotive, industry and high-end consumer sectors. The company was acquired by Maxim Integrated in 2011 for $164 million. SensorDynamics developed and produced custom-made designs and standard components for use in vehicle stabilization, occupant protection, navigation systems, keyless go systems and autonomous energy generators for wireless and battery free controllers for industrial, automotive and high-end consumer application. With its headquarters in Graz, Austria, SensorDynamics had offices in Italy and Germany and a worldwide sales and distribution network. The company employed about 130 people in 2011.

== History ==
SensorDynamics was founded in 2003 by Herbert Gartner, Hubertus Christ, Jürgen Tittel and Volker Kempe. Financed by national and international Venture Capital investors the company successfully closed four equity rounds in 2004, 2007, 2009 and 2011. In 2005 SensorDynamics was ranked under the top 100 European high tech companies by Tornado Insider and awarded the Fast Forward Award 2005 in Austria. From the beginning the Company strongly cooperated with the Institute of Silicon Technology Fraunhofer Society in Itzehoe and expanded this cooperation with long-term agreements in 2007. In October 2007 SensorDynamics started a deep cooperation with US consumer electronics supplier Kionix. In August 2008 EnOcean and SensorDynamics announced the launch world's first energy harvesting system on chip SOC product. In March 2009 SensorDynamics launched MEMS gyroscopes for industrial, medical and consumer applications. In November 2009 Chipworks selected SensorDynamics' MEMS product SD755 as product of the year 2009. In November 2010 SensorDynamics announced XY angular rate and an XYZ angular rate devices in 6x6x1.8 mm3 QFN40-packages. In December 2010 SensorDynamics announced worldwide's first fully characterized and specified 6 x 6 x 1.2 mm 6DoF IMU (six degrees of freedom inertial measurement unit) including evaluation boards. In July 2011 SensorDynamics was acquired by Maxim Integrated, a recognized leader in analog and mixed-signal semiconductor products. Maxim Integrated, headquartered in San Jose, California, is in Fortune 1000, and is included in the NASDAQ-100, the Russell 1000, and MSCI USA indices. Maxim was paying $164 million to acquire SensorDynamics.

== Product portfolio ==
SensorDynamics focused on three product groups, for each of which the company had created a development platform to guarantee a maximum re-use of silicon proven analogue and digital IPs. This was the basis for both application-specific developments and adaptations of existing products.

=== Inertial microsensor systems ===
SensorDynamics had developed and produced world's first MEMS combo sensors in combining MEMS motion sensors (angular rate and/or acceleration) with sophisticated analogue-digital electronics (ASIC) in micro packages to form a large-scale of integrated micro sensor system. Applications included electronic stabilization systems, rollover detection and navigation sets for ’blind reckoning’ without GPS support.

=== Intelligent sensor interface circuits ===
SensorDynamics had a wealth of expertise in the development and manufacturing of intelligent electronic signal conditioning circuitry of macro sensors such as core and planar coils, resistors, capacitive and magneto resistive sensors. Cooperation with the customer produces application-specific sensor systems that combined macro sensors and electronic signal conditioning at module level.

=== Wireless sensors ===
Examples of wireless sensors were to be found in ‘Keyless go’ or tyre pressure systems. However, Wireless and battery-less sensor systems are increasingly adopted in industrial applications; especially automation such as smart LF/RF applications. Energy harvesting, in other words powering devices from the energy produced by movement, heat or light, was enabled by SensorDynamics' system on chip SOC products. Sensor systems that incorporated energy use optimization management – integrated processing of sensor signals through to the transmission of control signals at radio frequencies – was a special discipline of SensorDynamics.

== Key people ==
- Herbert Gartner (Founder, CEO 04/2003 - 09/2003, CFO 09/2003 - 03/2012)
- Hubertus Christ (Founder, CEO 09/2003 - 03/2012)
- Volker Kempe (Founder)
- Jürgen Tittel (Founder)

== Management and team ==
The company had about 130 employees world-wide when it was acquired by Maxim Integrated in July 2011. Their key qualifications included: extensive experience in sensor system development, MEMS and semiconductor technology, testing and quality assurance as well as deep knowledge of the automotive electronics market and strong applications expertise. SensorDynamics as a company had been operational as such since 2003, although the nucleus of the team worked together in prior companies since the 1990s.

== Quality and environmental management ==
As SensorDynamics was also providing sensitive integrated products and systems to the automotive market, the quality and environmental management system was based on the ISO/TS16949 and ISO 14001 standard. SensorDynamics satisfied all automotive quality requirements (i.e. ISO/TS16949, ISO 14001, IEC61508, ISO 26262, AEC Q100).

== Key investors ==
- I4G Investment GmbH (2003 - 2011);
- Siemens Venture Capital (2004 - 2011);
- DEWB (2004 - 2011);
- Steirische Beteiligungsfinanzierungsgesellschaft mbH (2004 -2011);
- FIDURA Private Equity Fonds (2007 - 2011);
- PONTIS Capital (2007 -2011);
- Global Equity Partners (2004 - 2009);
- Austria Wirtschaftsservice GmbH (2003 - 2011);
- Austrian Research Promotion Agency (FFG) (2004 - today);

== Additional References ==
- BusinessWeek
- SensorDynamics Launches Gyroscope for Industrial, Medical and Consumer Applications
- Fraunhofer ISIT mit neuem Kooperationspartner für Inertialsensorik
- Das Fraunhofer ISIT und die SensorDynamics AG setzen bei der Entwicklung und Fertigung komplexer Mikrosysteme neue Maßstäbe
- ISIT präsentiert auf der Hannover Messe: Intelligente Bewegungssensorik für die Automobilindustrie
