= ASIX =

Taiwanese semiconductor company

ASIX Electronics Corporation
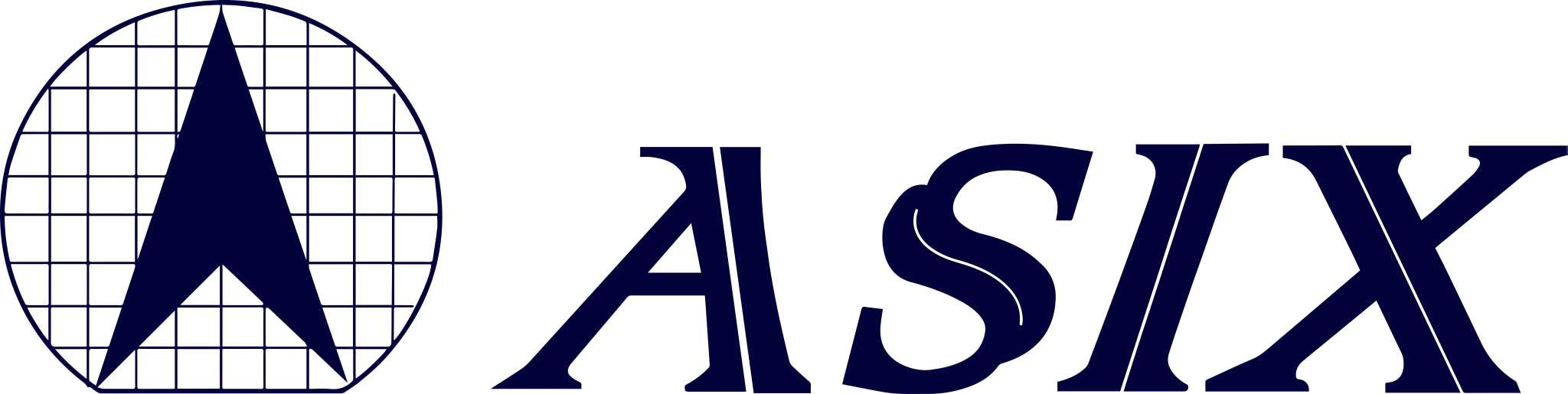
- Company type: Public
- Traded as: TWSE: 3169
- Industry: Semiconductor
- Founded: 1995
- Headquarters: Hsinchu, Taiwan
- Key people: Chun-Chi Wang (Chairman)
- Products: Industrial Ethernet ICs, USB Ethernet ICs, Embedded Ethernet ICs, I/O Interface ICs, UART Transceivers, Microcontrollers
- Revenue: NT$929 million (2025)
- Number of employees: 75 people (2025)
- Website: www.asix.com.tw

ASIX
- Traditional Chinese: 亞信電子股份有限公司
- Simplified Chinese: 亚信电子股份有限公司
Transcriptions

ASIX Electronics Corporation (Chinese: 亞信電子股份有限公司), founded in May 1995, a fabless IC design company located in the Hsinchu Science Park, Taiwan, specializing in industrial and embedded networking as well as I/O interface controller solutions.

== Corporate history ==
ASIX Electronics Corp. was listed on Taiwan OTC Stock Exchange (3169.TWO) in 2009. In its early years, ASIX focused on PC networking chips. Between 1998 and 1999, the company entered the notebook networking chip market, achieving a leading position in the PCMCIA Ethernet controller segment. This success enabled the company to surpass the break-even point and move into profitability. Since 2000, ASIX has expanded into embedded and USB Ethernet controllers. In 2018, the company introduced Greater China’s first EtherCAT slave controller chip for industrial automation applications.

- In August 2011, ASIX Electronics acquired the I/O Connectivity product line of MosChip Semiconductor Technology Ltd., a publicly listed company in India. This product line included three series: PCIe bridge, PCI bridge, and USB bridge.
- On November 5, 2014, ASIX Electronics acquired 100% equity of Zywyn Corporation, a U.S.-based company, for USD 8 million.
- On December 16, 2020, Airoha Technology, a subsidiary of MediaTek Group, obtained a 20% stake in ASIX Electronics through a private placement of common shares.

== Products ==
ASIX’s product portfolio includes,

- Industrial Ethernet Chips
- USB Ethernet Chips
- Embedded Ethernet Chips
- I/O Interface Chips
- UART Transceivers
- Microcontrollers

== Industrial Ethernet Chips ==
ASIX provides two families of industrial Ethernet solutions: the AX58xxx EtherCAT SubDevice Controller (ESC) and the AXM57104A TSN PCIe Giagbit network interface card (NIC). These products are primarily used in industrial automation, smart factory systems, and Industrial Internet of Things (IIoT) applications.

- EtherCAT Slave (SubDevice) controllers: AX58400, AX58200, AX58101, AX58100
- TSN PCIe Gigabit NIC solution: AXM57104A

== USB Ethernet Chips ==
ASIX provides two families of USB Ethernet solutions: SuperSpeed USB Ethernet chips and High-Speed USB Ethernet chips. These products are primarily used in computer peripherals, smart home devices, and office networking applications.

- USB 3.2 to Ethernet chips: AX88279A, AX88279, AX88179B, AX88179A
- USB 2.0 to Ethernet chips: AX88772E, AX88772C

== Embedded Ethernet Chips ==
ASIX provides embedded Ethernet solutions based on Non-PCI/SRAM-like and SPI interfaces, which are primarily used in smart home, office, and embedded networking applications.

- Non-PCI/SRAM-like embedded Ethernet chips: AX88796C, AX88796B
- SPI Ethernet chips: AX88796C

== I/O Interface Chips ==
ASIX provides PCIe and USB families of I/O bridge solutions, including the AX99100A PCIe bridge chip and the AX78140 and AX78120 USB bridge chips. These products are primarily used in industrial computers and I/O interface connectors, supporting functions such as PCIe/USB to serial ports, PCIe/USB to UART, PCIe/USB to RS-232, PCIe/USB to RS-485, PCIe/USB to parallel ports, PCIe to SPI interfaces, PCIe to local bus, and PCIe to I/O controller interfaces.

- PCIe to serial/parallel & I/O bridge chips: AX99100A
- USB to serial/parallel chips: AX78140, AX78120

ASIX provides solutions for EtherCAT-to-IO-Link gateways and IO-Link device software stacks, enabling the integration of IO-Link sensors and actuators into EtherCAT industrial Ethernet environments to support smart factory applications.

- AX58400 EtherCAT-to-IO-Link gateway module solution
- ASIX IO-Link device software protocol stack solution

== UART Transceivers ==
ASIX provides UART transceiver solutions, including 5V RS-232 transceivers, 3V RS-232 transceivers, 5V RS-485 transceivers, and 3V RS-485 transceivers. These products are primarily used in industrial computers and I/O interface connectors.

- 5V RS-232 transceivers: ZT2xxE, ZT213F/AE
- 3V RS-232 transceivers: AX3243E/F, ZT32xxE/F, ZT1385E
- 5V RS-485 transceivers: ZT4xxE/H, ZT13085E, ZT3087E
- 3V RS-485 transceivers: ZT34xxE, ZT307xE

== Microcontrollers ==
ASIX Electronics provides three types of microcontroller solutions, including the AX6800x USB KVM switch single-chip, the AX2200x Wi-Fi network single-chip, and the AX110xx Ethernet single-chip. These products are primarily used in smart home and office applications.

- USB KVM switch SoC: AX68002, AX68004
- Wi-Fi Network SoC: AX22001
- Embedded Ethernet SoC: AX11001, AX11005, AX11015, AX11025

== See also ==
- List of companies of Taiwan
- List of system-on-a-chip suppliers
- Network interface controller (NIC)
- Semiconductor industry in Taiwan
