= List of countries by integrated circuit exports =

The following is a list of countries by integrated circuit exports.

== International Trade Centre ==
Data is for 2024, in thousands of United States dollars and tons.

List of countries by integrated circuit exports (2024)
Country	Value exported (thousands USD)	Trade balance (thousands USD)	Quantity exported (tons)
World	1,070,609,341	−146,127,974	–
Hong Kong	220,079,056	−6,783,278	–
Taiwan	164,902,009	70,611,243	31,780
China	160,012,624	−226,670,072	44,460
South Korea	120,193,037	59,679,029	18,390
Singapore	119,160,244	21,306,130	–
Malaysia	76,741,548	22,468,621	–
United States	50,669,796	10,280,056	–
Japan	32,479,545	9,151,220	–
Vietnam	32,130,191	−30,757,302	–
Philippines	22,623,022	9,473,750	14,296
Germany	18,776,049	289,031	16,135
Thailand	8,640,933	−16,021,145	–
Ireland	8,232,643	3,306,673	590
France	6,158,686	2,411,918	6,721
Israel	5,793,375	4,144,526	–
Mexico	3,387,921	−22,351,295	–
Netherlands	3,046,946	−1,509,020	60,609
Belgium	2,363,491	−1,294,437	10,023
Italy	2,108,125	389,166	5,177
Czech Republic	1,681,468	−2,502,367	15,215
United Kingdom	1,044,116	−1,106,030	3,712
Switzerland	950,438	154,907	1,052
Austria	917,831	1,789	–
Morocco	896,083	435,164	–
Malta	848,286	204,924	–
Indonesia	706,503	−3,351,145	2,620
Canada	643,192	−987,794	–
Portugal	621,060	−1,219,920	12,197
Bulgaria	576,829	165,069	1,395
Hungary	481,197	−3,369,223	–
Poland	480,401	−3,064,667	10,011
Spain	444,362	−752,625	–
Finland	416,311	−102,564	367
Sweden	287,417	−714,554	–
India	272,543	−23,539,100	–
Denmark	238,564	−152,125	9,090
Slovakia	208,120	−553,634	2,170
Romania	181,136	−1,985,733	–
Serbia	115,722	−35,525	284
Cambodia	93,214	−27,115	387
Australia	85,492	−357,314	–
Brazil	84,786	−5,808,931	1,785
Latvia	74,733	−54,866	640
Tunisia	70,586	−301,352	–
United Arab Emirates	60,783	−360,251	–
Costa Rica	58,674	−88,278	238
Estonia	57,452	−210,836	477
Norway	56,090	−154,659	3,238
Lithuania	45,842	−227,990	5,217
Slovenia	41,205	−60,539	2,210
Turkey	35,058	−808,850	1,867
Trinidad and Tobago	33,046	−313,220	–
Greece	31,136	−44,088	2,177
Bahrain	30,440	22,859	–
Ukraine	22,721	−234,939	36
South Africa	20,974	−123,508	–
Suriname	18,763	−117,225	–
Qatar	17,392	10,387	–
Saudi Arabia	17,089	−128,723	575
Russia	14,240	−284,783	–
Belarus	13,535	6,913	–
Egypt	8,383	−177,640	–
Croatia	7,008	−36,271	11
Colombia	6,603	−74,381	570
Sri Lanka	6,258	−29,668	–
Eswatini	5,636	5,147	–
New Zealand	5,614	−44,117	48
Macao	5,373	−491,334	12
Laos	4,176	−23,113	–
Luxembourg	3,616	−16,377	225
Dominican Republic	3,496	−108,601	32
Cameroon	3,054	2,182	–
Bosnia and Herzegovina	2,945	−7,980	22
Chile	2,902	−44,635	–
Nauru	2,659	2,653	1
Nigeria	2,483	−13,453	–
Kyrgyzstan	2,129	−1,014	1,150
North Macedonia	2,117	−115,940	431
Jordan	1,840	329	–
Panama	1,834	−4,037	70
Grenada	1,458	−23,035	–
Mali	1,355	602	–
Cayman Islands	1,326	300	–
Ghana	1,295	−11,443	–
Curaçao	1,148	−2,862	–
Lebanon	1,119	−2,298	46
Antigua and Barbuda	1,028	−24,978	97
Guatemala	1,009	−12,966	158
Papua New Guinea	978	2	–
Bangladesh	942	−293,159	–
Kazakhstan	914	−52,780	14
Andorra	889	−9,501	–
North Korea	853	853	–
Pakistan	786	−16,986	–
Rwanda	701	593	–
Armenia	690	−165	–
Ecuador	689	−28,936	186
Peru	674	−41,801	76
Moldova	659	−5,823	–
Venezuela	638	−561	–
Iran	579	−24,178	–
Mauritius	425	−4	24
Timor-Leste	375	35	–
Cyprus	368	−1,546	55
Algeria	345	−29,716	–
New Caledonia	338	27	–
Benin	323	191	2,259
Saint Lucia	323	−91	–
Jamaica	312	−1,208	–
Uzbekistan	299	−36,668	–
Uruguay	274	−12,405	106
Tuvalu	268	−407	–
Afghanistan	246	226	–
DR Congo	241	−670	–
Botswana	238	−574	58
Nicaragua	228	−1,807	240
Honduras	222	−2,368	14
Saint Helena	215	162	–
Georgia	202	−3,981	7
Zimbabwe	200	−1,903	5
Ethiopia	180	−2,595	–
United States Minor Outlying Islands	172	−256	–
Togo	168	−110	294
Oman	149	−2,290	–
Sint Maarten (Dutch part)	143	−950	13
Kuwait	138	−4,765	636
Haiti	135	−209	–
British Virgin Islands	124	−594	–
Tanzania	120	−4,425	8
El Salvador	119	−4,291	3
Iceland	118	−4,310	138
Faroe Islands	117	−692	–
Tajikistan	102	−94	–
Senegal	98	−648	155
Falkland Islands	97	97	–
Saint Pierre and Miquelon	95	91	2
Dominica	91	53	–
Madagascar	90	−651	86
Libya	90	−419	9
Angola	89	−2,725	22
Palestine	86	66	–
Fiji	75	−481	–
Uganda	75	−942	2
Azerbaijan	72	−4,707	10
Iraq	69	−2,615	–
Turks and Caicos Islands	69	−80	–
Sierra Leone	64	−17	–
Paraguay	62	−15,021	39
Syria	61	9	–
Sao Tome and Principe	56	41	–
Cuba	46	−1,123	2
Guyana	46	−799	5
Argentina	44	−173,711	–
Palau	44	37	–
Saint Vincent and the Grenadines	44	−430	44
Pitcairn	43	43	–
Kenya	40	−18,677	14
Tokelau	40	−1,669	–
Brunei	38	−370	–
Bolivia	37	−1,332	–
Namibia	35	−934	1
Marshall Islands	33	−160	–
Burkina Faso	31	−4,187	30
Saint Kitts and Nevis	26	−6,466	–
Congo	24	−181	–
Bahamas	23	−430	–
Aruba	20	−2,959	–
Nepal	15	−1,636	–
Montserrat	15	−12	–
Zambia	15	−829	1
Sudan	14	−38	–
Christmas Island	14	−2	–
Turkmenistan	13	−186	–
Guinea	11	−440	–
French Southern and Antarctic Territories	10	−12	–
Micronesia	10	−5	–
Côte d'Ivoire	10	−6,443	9
Mongolia	9	−368	–
Cook Islands	8	−48	–
Yemen	8	−131	–
Somalia	8	−65	–
Wallis and Futuna	7	7	–
Mozambique	5	−1,727	–
Vanuatu	5	−113	–
Bonaire, Sint Eustatius and Saba	4	−1,435	2
Gabon	4	−878	–
Gibraltar	4	−50	–
Bermuda	4	−77	–
South Sudan	4	−3	–
Tonga	3	−25	–
Greenland	3	−568	–
Eritrea	3	−11	–
Niger	3	−263	–
Djibouti	2	−255	–
Bhutan	2	−53	–
Cocos (Keeling) Islands	2	−23	–
Western Sahara	2	−33	–
Samoa	1	−41	–
Solomon Islands	1	−466	–
Norfolk Island	1	1	–
Montenegro	1	−1,509	–

== Observatory of Economic Complexity ==
Data is for 2023, in United States dollars.

List of countries by integrated circuit exports (2024)
Country	Trade value
Taiwan	180,163,373,733
China	140,057,270,260
South Korea	132,103,242,521
Malaysia	72,665,482,188
Singapore	66,920,734,051
United States	42,257,288,916
Japan	36,119,737,264
Vietnam	32,355,323,645
Philippines	27,532,859,400
Germany	18,243,832,420
Thailand	14,937,876,747
Hong Kong	12,873,749,318
Ireland	10,840,207,538
France	9,412,737,071
Israel	7,705,206,272
Netherlands	6,720,924,755
Mexico	3,377,760,283
Belgium	2,384,261,116
Italy	1,940,135,308
Malta	1,314,214,476
United Kingdom	1,228,698,407
Czech Republic	1,097,397,730
Costa Rica	1,074,149,039
Austria	1,017,555,725
Canada	833,842,360
Switzerland	826,366,206
Indonesia	786,586,265
Morocco	759,530,041
Portugal	546,161,850
Hungary	504,911,651
Finland	462,240,337
Spain	435,645,675
Bulgaria	405,560,755
Sweden	318,730,076
Poland	296,138,309
India	226,931,900
Denmark	211,740,683
United Arab Emirates	183,150,429
Romania	161,067,894
Serbia	154,127,901
Slovakia	134,833,220
Tunisia	85,428,334
Brazil	79,891,487
Latvia	68,263,584
Norway	66,657,458
Estonia	66,045,924
Australia	64,510,676
Macau	52,145,654
Turkey	43,193,580
Slovenia	39,995,423
Lithuania	37,532,365
Cambodia	31,747,802
South Africa	28,859,922
Greece	28,648,323
Armenia	22,382,604
Ukraine	22,009,920
Russia	20,695,741
Kazakhstan	17,630,799
Kyrgyzstan	12,364,040
Bahrain	12,142,616
Samoa	11,715,794
Belarus	11,261,832
Sri Lanka	11,250,703
Cyprus	10,419,889
Croatia	10,321,946
New Zealand	8,732,486
Luxembourg	7,318,230
Saudi Arabia	5,489,369
Iran	5,129,968
Colombia	4,501,483
Gambia	4,411,396
Andorra	4,289,708
Albania	4,139,524
Bosnia and Herzegovina	3,841,944
Egypt	3,430,980
Dominican Republic	3,210,278
Kuwait	3,077,400
Lebanon	2,995,586
El Salvador	2,338,340
Chile	2,253,901
Seychelles	2,051,314
Iceland	1,854,729
Mali	1,731,672
Trinidad and Tobago	1,652,113
North Macedonia	1,624,882
Cayman Islands	1,614,301
Papua New Guinea	1,568,289
Laos	1,267,607
Bangladesh	1,230,950
Myanmar	1,181,429
Panama	1,103,858
Mauritius	1,100,350
Ecuador	1,017,867
Kenya	965,853
Guatemala	943,404
Qatar	878,383
Argentina	872,977
Cameroon	832,069
Oman	681,134
Senegal	658,419
Pakistan	611,324
Peru	522,599
Brunei	490,135
Uruguay	470,775
Eswatini	416,126
Curacao	402,383
Uzbekistan	389,744
Moldova	373,516
Gabon	366,700
Honduras	345,089
Madagascar	324,799
Bolivia	317,226
French Polynesia	251,719
Jordan	243,888
Tanzania	234,227
Georgia	223,103
New Caledonia	213,894
Afghanistan	192,465
Sierra Leone	176,984
Guinea	176,282
Algeria	169,073
Saint Helena	148,745
North Korea	147,982
Fiji	141,588
Niger	129,637
Uganda	127,100
Ethiopia	123,061
Montenegro	122,898
Namibia	121,491
Timor-Leste	110,143
Northern Mariana Islands	109,453
Nigeria	103,006
Tonga	100,565
Malawi	97,636
Azerbaijan	96,714
Rwanda	96,579
Jamaica	95,882
Yemen	90,935
Maldives	89,045
San Marino	88,200
Barbados	85,799
British Virgin Islands	84,797
Sao Tome and Principe	83,144
Saint Vincent and the Grenadines	78,803
Tajikistan	78,063
Greenland	76,388
Burkina Faso	72,572
Angola	69,173
Congo	64,556
Mozambique	64,340
Liberia	61,270
Chad	58,504
Mauritania	56,989
Iraq	47,326
Zambia	46,658
Botswana	45,397
Tuvalu	42,335
Anguilla	41,202
Tokelau	38,580
Togo	38,138
Cote d'Ivoire	35,332
Bahamas	34,830
Mongolia	28,488
Wallis and Futuna	23,686
American Samoa	23,067
Nicaragua	21,812
Venezuela	21,776
Zimbabwe	20,963
DR Congo	20,124
Benin	18,196
Turkmenistan	18,152
Cuba	18,138
Kiribati	17,623
Dominica	17,140
Haiti	16,860
Montserrat	16,761
Marshall Islands	15,563
French South Antarctic Territory	14,052
Guyana	13,780
Cape Verde	13,712
Djibouti	13,636
Belize	12,400
British Indian Ocean Territory	11,325
Sudan	10,768
Ghana	9,613
Paraguay	8,656
Bhutan	8,479
Saint Martin	8,022
Central African Republic	7,884
Nauru	7,778
Pitcairn Islands	6,929
Saint Lucia	6,906
Palau	6,002
Suriname	5,664
Libya	5,179
Norfolk Island	4,715
Saint Kitts and Nevis	4,123
Guinea-Bissau	3,602
Turks and Caicos Islands	3,546
Aruba	3,319
Cocos (Keeling) Islands	2,688
Eritrea	1,957
Lesotho	1,740
Saint Barthelemy	1,611
Comoros	1,384
Syria	1,243
Nepal	1,231
Antigua and Barbuda	1,205
Grenada	1,017
Gibraltar	1,011
Somalia	905
Burundi	413
Christmas Island	385
Palestine	292
Falkland Islands	279
Micronesia	252
Solomon Islands	34
Bermuda	16
Vanuatu	7

== See also ==
- List of flat panel display manufacturers
- List of integrated circuit manufacturers
- List of solid−state drive manufacturers
- List of system on a chip suppliers
