= Disco Corporation =

Japanese precision tools maker

DISCO Corporation
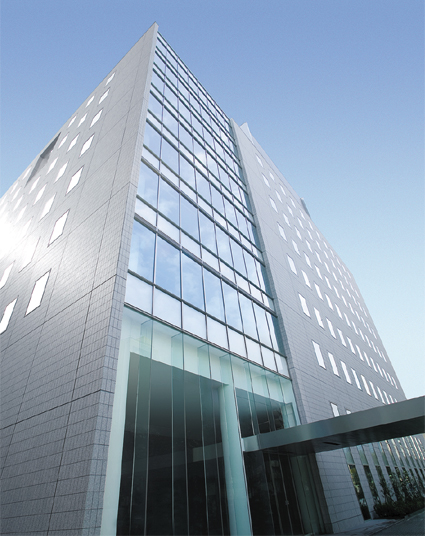
- Disco's headquarters in Ōta, Tokyo
- Native name: 株式会社ディスコ
- Type: Public KK; Nikkei225 component
- Traded as: TYO: 6146
- ISIN: JP3548600000
- Industry: Semiconductor
- Founded: May 5, 1937; 89 years ago in Kure city, Hiroshima as Dai-Ichi Seitosho Company
- Founder: Mitsuo Sekiya
- Headquarters: Omori-Kita, Ōta, Tokyo 162-8557, Japan
- Area served: Worldwide
- Key people: Hitoshi Mizorogi (Chairman of the Board); Kazuma Sekiya (President and CEO)
- Products: Dicing saws; Laser saws; Grinders; Polishers; Wafer mounters
- Revenue: ▲JPY ¥253.78 billion (US$ 2.21 billion) (FY 2021)
- Net income: ▲JPY ¥66.21 billion (US$ 576 million) (FY 2021)
- Number of employees: 4,091 (as of March 31, 2021)
- Website: Official website

DISCO Corporation (株式会社ディスコ, Kabushiki-gaisha Disuko) is a Japanese precision tools maker, especially for the semiconductor production industry.

The company makes dicing saws and laser saws to cut semiconductor silicon wafers and other materials; grinders to process silicon and compound semiconductor wafers to ultra-thin levels; polishing machines to remove the grinding damage layer from the wafer back-side and to increase chip strength.

The company is listed on the Tokyo Stock Exchange, where it is a component of the Nikkei 225 index.

== History ==
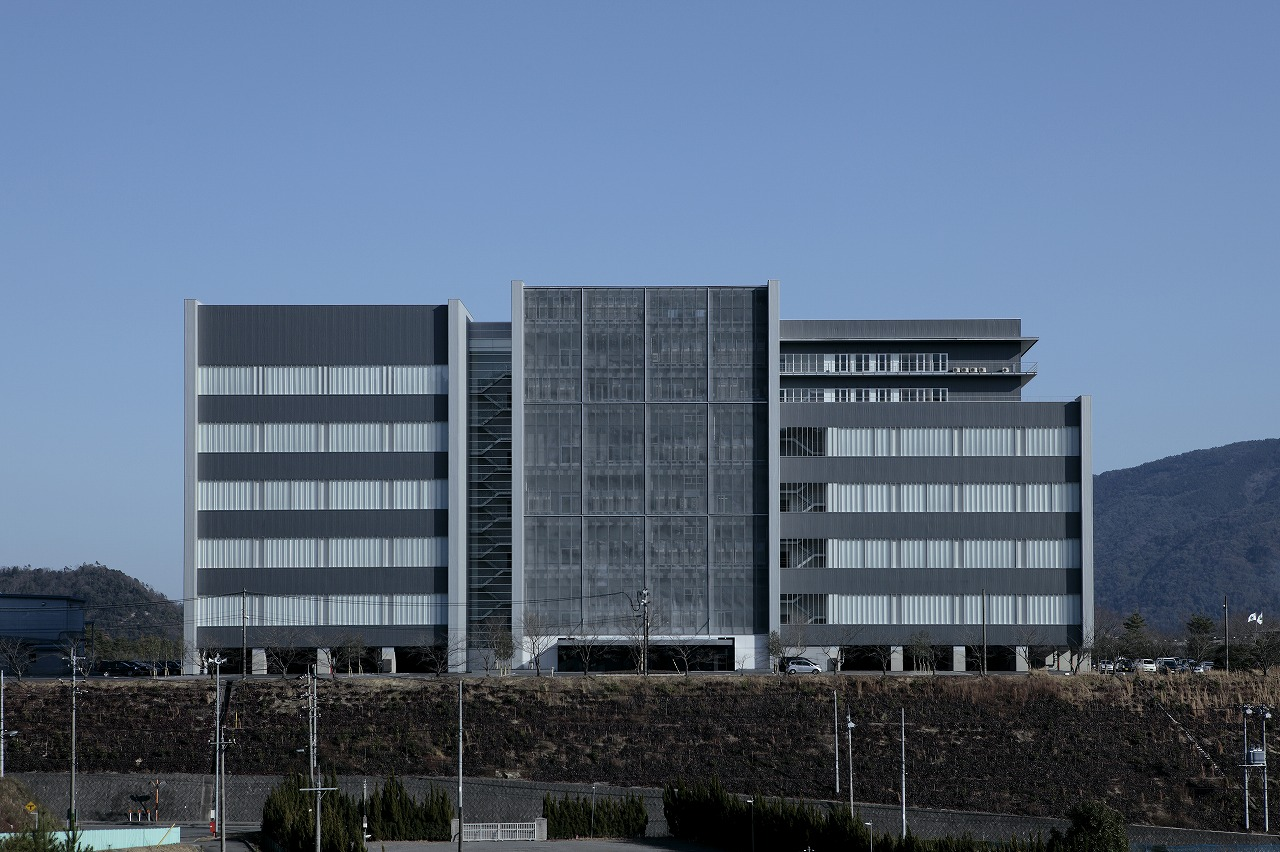
The company's Kuwabata plant in Kure, Hiroshima

The company was founded as Daiichi-Seitosho in May 1937, as an industrial abrasive wheel manufacturer.

After World War II Japan faced a construction boom which also helped DISCO to boost its sales. The company's grinder discs were in high demand from utility companies, which needed them to manufacture watt-meters.

In December 1968 the company developed and released an ultra-thin resinoid cutting wheel, Microncut. The wheel contained diamond powder and as a result it was capable of making sharp, precision cuts as demanded in the semiconductor manufacturing process. There were no cutting machines available in the market on which ultra-thin precision wheels could be mounted and run, DISCO decided to develop its own machine in 1975. The cutting machine, DAD-2h, received instant recognition from semiconductor companies, including Texas Instruments.

The company adopted the name of DISCO Corporation in May 1977, was listed with the Japan Securities Dealers' Association in October 1989, and entered the First Section of the Tokyo Stock Exchange in December 1999.

== Will System and Free-Market Management ==
Since 2011, Disco Corporation has operated under a unique management system based on an internal currency called Will, which applies free-market principles to its organizational structure. Introduced by CEO Kazuma Sekiya, the Will system eliminates traditional hierarchical directives, allowing employees to choose tasks freely through a company app, bidding or bartering for opportunities using Will. Tasks range from technical work, such as testing semiconductor grinding tools, to administrative duties, like processing invoices, each assigned a Will value. Employees earn Will by completing tasks, which influences their quarterly bonuses, with high earners significantly boosting their income; in 2023, one employee earned over ¥59 million through Will accumulation.

The system penalizes actions deemed costly to productivity, such as booking meeting rooms or smoking breaks, by deducting Will, and assumes an "existence cost" that places employees in a negative balance at the start of each month. Will is generated primarily through sales revenue, with approximately 400 million Will created per ¥1 billion in sales, distributed to incentivize tasks across departments. A dedicated team manages 772 penalty and 337 reward items, overseen by a Will Management Office. The system also includes a weekly "Coliseum" event, where employees pitch productivity improvements, with Will used to vote for winning ideas.

Sekiya credits the Will system with improving business performance, employee engagement, and market share. Companies like Sony, Toyota, and Panasonic have studied the system, though none have adopted it, citing its radical departure from conventional management. Critics, including former employees, argue that Will fosters short-termism, as tasks with immediate revenue impact are prioritized, potentially undervaluing long-term innovation. Some liken it to a gamified control mechanism, with Sekiya’s ability to issue new Will and adjust rules raising concerns about autocratic influence. Economists note that Will, non-transferable outside Disco, functions more as an internal accounting tool than a true currency.
