= Trusted Foundry Program =

The Trusted Foundry Program also called the trusted suppliers program is a United States Department of Defense program designed to secure the manufacturing infrastructure for information technology vendors providing hardware to the military. It was originally implemented as an arrangement with IBM before being broadened in 2007 to include other microelectronics suppliers to increase competition and ensure the entire supply chain could be trusted.
