= Volterra Semiconductor =

- Industry: Semiconductors
- Founded: 1996
- Defunct: 2013
- Fate: Acquired by Maxim Integrated
- Headquarters: Fremont, California
- Number of employees: 264 (2013)

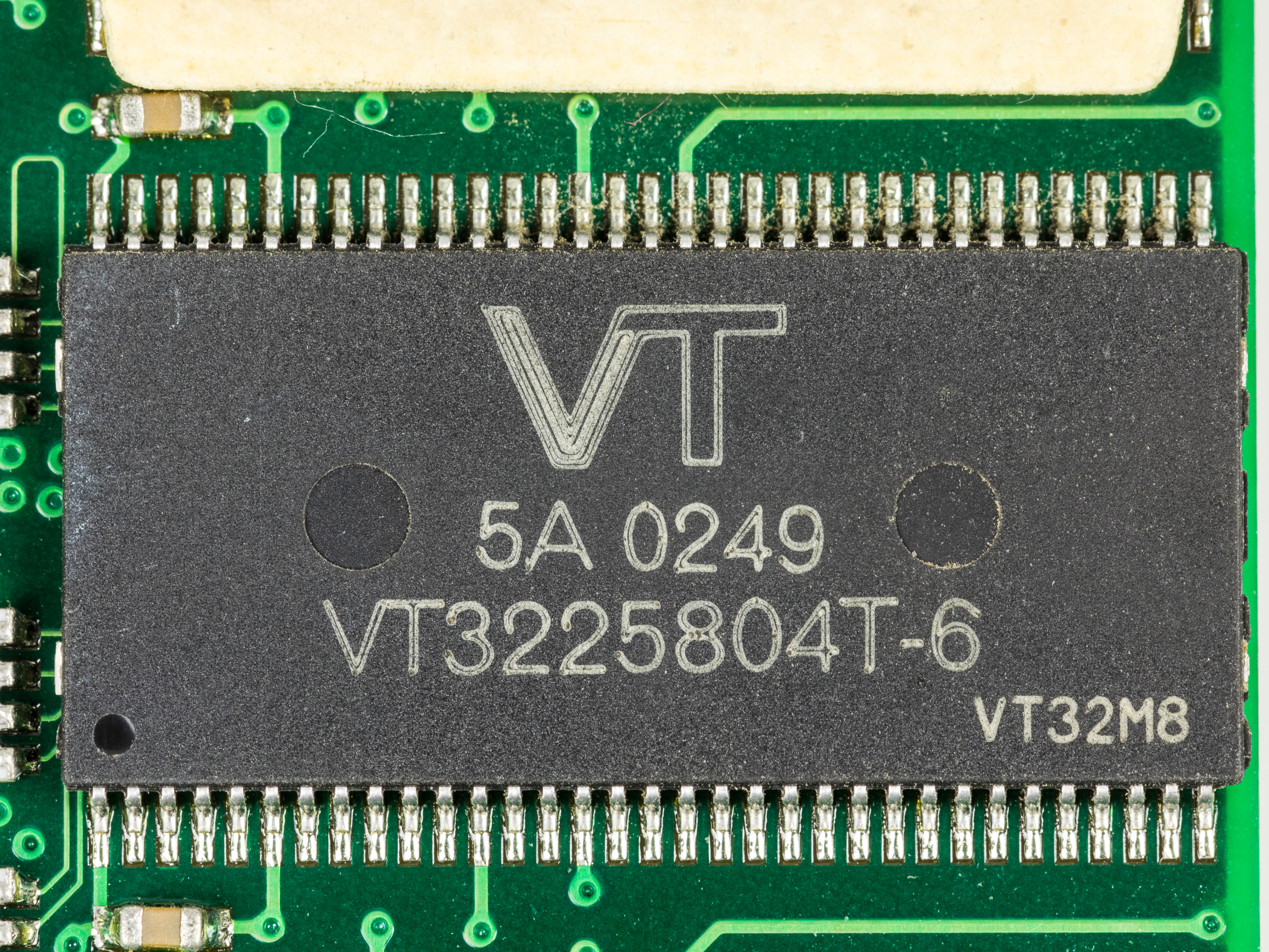
Volterra Semiconductor VT3225804T-6

Volterra Semiconductor, commonly known as Volterra, was a fabless semiconductor company that designed and manufactured mixed-signal integrated circuits used in power management applications. The company was founded in 1996 and was headquartered in Fremont, California, United States. Volterra was acquired by Maxim Integrated on October 2013.

Volterra became a public company via an initial public offering of its stock at $8.00 per share on July 29, 2004.

== Product line ==
Volterra's product line consisted primarily of integrated circuits and chipsets that manage power for low voltage, extremely high current applications, such as desktop and notebook PC and workstation motherboards, network servers, and video controllers.

The company directly employed about 200-500 people throughout its history. It employed 264 people and reported net revenue of $39.9 million for the first quarter of 2013.

Volterra was named for Vito Volterra, an Italian mathematician and physicist, who is best known as the father of the Volterra series.
