= Wafer backgrinding =

Used to reduce the thickness of a microchip, for die stacking or for thin devices

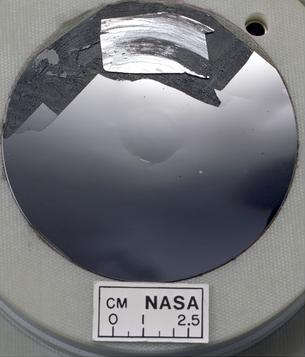

Wafer backgrinding is a semiconductor device fabrication step during which wafer thickness is reduced to allow stacking and high-density packaging of integrated circuits (ICs).

ICs are produced on semiconductor wafers that undergo a multitude of processing steps. The silicon wafers predominantly used today have diameters of 200 and 300 mm. They are roughly 750 μm thick to ensure mechanical stability and to avoid warping during high-temperature processing steps.

Smartcards, USB memory sticks, smartphones, handheld music players, and other ultra-compact electronic products would not be feasible in their present form without minimizing the size of their various components along all dimensions. The backsides of the wafers are thus ground prior to wafer dicing (separation of the individual microchips). Wafers thinned down to 75–50 μm are common today.

Prior to grinding, wafers are commonly laminated with UV-curable backgrinding tape, which ensures against wafer surface damage during backgrinding and prevents wafer surface contamination caused by infiltration of grinding fluid or debris. The wafers are also washed with deionized water throughout the process, which helps prevent contamination.

The process is also known as "backlap", "backfinish", "backside grinding", or "wafer thinning".

After backgrinding, a finished wafer is cut into individual chips in a process called die singulation.

== See also ==
- Back-illuminated sensor
