= Inprocomm =

Inprocomm, Inc.
- Industry: Semiconductors
- Founded: 2002
- Defunct: 2005
- Fate: Merged into MediaTek
- Successor: MediaTek
- Headquarters: Hsinchu, Taiwan
- Key people: Kwang-Cheng Chen, founder
- Products: Wireless LAN

Inprocomm, Inc. (Chinese: 集耀; pinyin: Jíyào), formerly Integrated Programmable Communications, Inc., was a wireless semiconductor design firm, based in Taiwan. The company originally focused on producing IEEE 802.11b, g and a/g chips before beginning to branch out to other portable devices. It was acquired by MediaTek, Inc. in early 2005.

== Products ==
Inprocomm produced seven wireless chip designs in total, along with accompanying reference designs for PCI, mini-PCI and CardBus. IPN2120 and IPN2220 are the most common; in particular, D-Link used an IPN2220 chip in their DI-624M router, and Linksys used the IPN2120 in some of their PCI cards (such as the WMP11 version 4) and mini-PCI cards. Linksys mini-PCI cards with IPN2220 can be found in some of the 2004 laptop models, such as the TravelMate 2300 and Aspire 1520 series from Acer, and the Packard Bell EasyNote A5560. Inprocomm chips have also been used in Buffalo and Toshiba products.
