= Pragmatic Semiconductor =

British semiconductor company

Pragmatic Semiconductor is a UK-based flexible microchip maker, with its headquarters located in Cambridge, England. Its manufacturing facility, or foundry, is located in County Durham. In 2023 it received the largest ever venture financing for a European chip company of around £182 million in total.

Pragmatic designs and manufactures FlexICs – ultra-thin, physically flexible microchips based on thin-film transistor (TFT) technology. TFTs are a special type of field-effect transistor (FET) in which the transistor is made by thin-film deposition. They are grown on a supporting, but non-conducting, substrate. This differs from the conventional bulk metal-oxide-semiconductor field-effect transistor (MOSFET), such as silicon wafers, where the semiconductor material typically is the substrate.

Silicon semiconductor manufacturing is resource-intensive, involving high temperatures, high energy consumption, extensive chemical use, and significant emissions of greenhouse gases, notably fluorinated gases, which possess a high global warming potential. By contrast, the deposition method used to create TFTs uses low annealing temperatures, reducing energy consumption, both for heating and cooling, and reducing the use of fluorinated gases, so reducing the carbon impact of production.

FlexICs are able to be embedded inside objects like product packaging. They are then accessed through near-field communication (NFC) technology that does not require a clear line of sight.

== History ==
Pragmatic was founded in 2010 by academic Richard Price and serial entrepreneur Scott White. It established its first manufacturing facility in 2013, at the Centre for Process Innovation's High-Value Manufacturing Catapult at NETPark, County Durham.

An initial Series A investment round in 2014 attracted $8 million, with semiconductor IP giant Arm and Cambridge Innovation Capital amongst initial investors. A year later, the company's headquarters were established at Cambridge Science Park, in the heart of the Silicon Fen.

In 2017, a Series B investment round raised $24 million. A key investor was Fortune 500 packaging company Avery Dennison, who saw potential in FlexICs' "unique item-level digital identities to improve consumer experiences in a number of new segments, such as fast-moving consumer goods".

In 2018 Pragmatic opened its first 200mm fabrication line in County Durham.

An oversubscribed Series C investment round in 2021 saw the company raise $125 million after an initial launch in October 2022 at $80 million. British Patient Capital, a subsidiary of the state-owned British Business Bank, provided £10m of the new funds. Other new investors include high-tech investor In-Q-Tel and venture capital firm Prosperity7 Ventures (the diversified growth fund under Aramco Ventures). North East Development Capital Fund and the Finance Durham Fund, both managed by Maven Capital Partners, also contributed.

In 2022, Pragmatic appointed David Moore as chief executive, replacing co-founder Scott White. Moore previously served as chief strategy officer at Nasdaq-listed chip firm Micron Technology, as well as several executive roles at the chip giant Intel.

Moore oversaw Pragmatic's 2023 Series D funding, which raised a record $231 million – the largest ever European semiconductor venture funding round. M&G's Catalyst and the National Wealth Fund (formerly UK Infrastructure Bank) co-led the funding round with participation from new investors including Northern Gritstone, Latitude and MVolution Partners, and existing investors such as British Patient Capital, Cambridge Innovation Capital and Prosperity7.

In 2024, HRH The Princess Royal officially opened Pragmatic Park, which houses the UK's first 300mm wafer fab.

== Technology ==
In 2020 the company announced the first fully functional non-silicon Arm processor, built in collaboration with its investor, Arm. An article about the project was published in Nature journal under the title, A natively flexible 32-bit Arm microprocessor.

A 2022 collaboration with international research and development organisation IMEC and KU Leuven saw the development of an 8-bit microprocessor in 0.8 μm metal-oxide flexible technology capable of running real-time complex assembly code. The microprocessor was implemented with a design flow that allowed the creation of a new standard cell library for metal-oxide thin-film technologies – relevant for designing a broad range of loT applications.

Pragmatic's thin-film technology was used to integrate the approximately ~16,000 metal-oxide thin-film transistors on a 24.9mm^{2} flexible chip.

Malodour classification using low-cost flexible electronics – a 2023 collaboration with Arm and Unilever – was published in Nature Communications journal. The paper proposed a technology-based solution to automate body malodour measurement, developing a customs core classification system comprising an electronic nose sensor array, a sensor readout interface and a machine learning hardware fabricated on low-cost flexible substrates.

2023 also saw the publication of Low-cost and efficient prediction hardware for tabular data in Nature Electronics journal – research on tiny classifier circuits undertaken by Pragmatic with the University of Manchester.

This was followed in 2024 by Bendable non-silicon RISC-V microprocessor – a collaboration with Qamcom, specialists in hardware, software and system development, and Harvard University, which was again published in Nature journal.

== Products ==
In early 2025, the company launched Pragmatic FlexIC Platform Gen 3, designed for mixed-signal flexible application-specific integrated circuit (ASIC) design. The company reported a 10x digital power and 3x digital area improvement over the previous generation. The platform consists of a process design kit (PDK) that is compatible with standard electronic design automation (EDA) tools, and standard cell libraries related to the design and manufacture of custom FlexICs – the company's ultra-thin, physically flexible chips.

This was quickly followed by the launch of the first product in the company's near-field communication (NFC) product line, Pragmatic NFC Connect, delivering industry-standard NFC endpoint capability in an ultra-thin, flexible form factor.

Pragmatic claims the product has an "industry-leading carbon footprint", thanks to its unique manufacturing process, which it says uses "less energy, water and harmful chemicals than standard semiconductor fabrication".

In 2026, the company launched Pragmatic NFC Protect a flexible NFC chip targeting tamper evidence for fast-moving consumer goods.
