= MStar =

Taiwanese semiconductor companies

MStar Semiconductor, Inc.
- Native name: 晨星半導體股份有限公司
- Type: Public
- Traded as: TWSE: 3697
- Industry: Fabless semiconductors
- Founded: 2002; 24 years ago
- Founder: Steve Yang
- Headquarters: Hsinchu Science Park, Hsinchu City, Taiwan
- Key people: Wayne Liang (chairman); Steve Yang (president and co-founder)
- Revenue: ▲US$1.07 billion (2010)
- Net income: ▲US$207 million (2010)
- Number of employees: 733
- Website: www.mstarsemi.com (no longer in use)

MStar Semiconductor, Inc. (Chinese: 晨星半導體股份有限公司; pinyin: Chénxīng Bàndǎotǐ Gǔfèn Yǒuxiàn Gōngsī) was a Taiwanese fabless semiconductor company specializing in mixed-mode integrated circuit technologies, based in Hsinchu Hsien. MStar made hardware for multimedia and wireless communications, in the form of display ICs and mixed-mode (i.e. combining analog and digital functions) ASIC/IPs, in addition to chip sets for GSM mobile handsets. MStar employed approx. 1300 in more than 10 branches worldwide. The company's revenue was around US$1067 million in 2010. The growth has been substantial, their revenue in 2005 was US$175 million. MStar is listed on the Taiwan Stock Exchange under the code 3697.

MStar was often referred as "Little-M" or "Morning Star" in Chinese community, as a contrary part of the bigger semiconductor company "Big-M", a.k.a. MediaTek.

MStar was a spin-off (2-1 stock split) from System General Technology in May 2002, where the power IC product line stayed in System General Technology while the employees with the display and RFID product lines transferred to the new spin-off. After the spin-off, System General Technology regretted the decision, and a 1-2 stock swap was taken to exchange the two companies back to their corresponding shareholders. Chairman and CEO of MStar was Wayne Liang (梁公偉), while Dr. Steve Yang (楊偉毅) was the executive vice president and co-founder.

In 2004, after being involved in a court case where in a ruling by the International Trade Commission (ITC), MStar Semiconductor were found guilty over infringing on a patent held by Genesis Microchip for a method to improve images on liquid-crystal-display (LCD) monitors and flat screen TVs.

On October 14, 2020, MStar came under investigation by the US International Trade Commission for allegedly infringing patents held by DIVX LLC of San Diego, California, US.

== Merger with MediaTek ==
On 22 June 2012 MediaTek Inc. (TWSE: 2454) announced it purchased 212 million to 254 million shares of MStar (TWSE: 3697 - 40% to 48% of its outstanding shares) for 0.794 MediaTek shares and NT$1 in cash per MStar share.

== Comparison table ==
Model Number	Fab	CPU				GPU		RAM		Hardware Decoding	Hardware Encoding	Sampl. Avail- ability	Utilizing Devices
Model Number	Fab	ISA	μarch	Cores	Freq. (GHz)	μarch	Freq. (MHz)	Type	Bus width	Hardware Decoding	Hardware Encoding	Sampl. Avail- ability	Utilizing Devices
MSO9180/MSO9810		ARMv7-A	Cortex-A9	4	1.5	Mali-450 MP(2 or 4?)	500						
6A908		ARMv7-A	Cortex-A9	4	1.45	Mali-450 MP4	500						
6A918		ARMv7-A	Cortex-A9	4	1.45	Mali-450 MP4	500						
6A928		ARMv7-A	Cortex-A17	4	1.4	Mali-T760 MP4	552			H.265 10bit up to 4k@60fps, H.264 up to 4k@30fps, VP9(?)			
6A838		ARMv8-A	Cortex-A53	4	1.7	Mali-T820							
6A848		ARMv8-A	Cortex-A73 + Cortex-A53	2+2		Mali-G51							
6A938		ARMv8-A	Cortex-A72 + Cortex-A53	2+2	1.7	Mali-T820 MP3	600			H.265 10bit up to 4k@60fps, H.264 up to 4k@30fps, VP9 10bit up to 4k@60fps			

== See also ==
- List of companies of Taiwan
