= Dicing tape =

Special adhesive tape used during microchip manufacture

Dicing tape is a backing tape used during wafer dicing or some other microelectronic substrate separation, the cutting apart of pieces of semiconductor or other material following wafer or module microfabrication. The tape holds the pieces of the substrate, in case of a wafer called as die, together during the cutting process, mounting them to a thin metal frame. The dies/substrate pieces are removed from the dicing tape later on in the electronics manufacturing process.

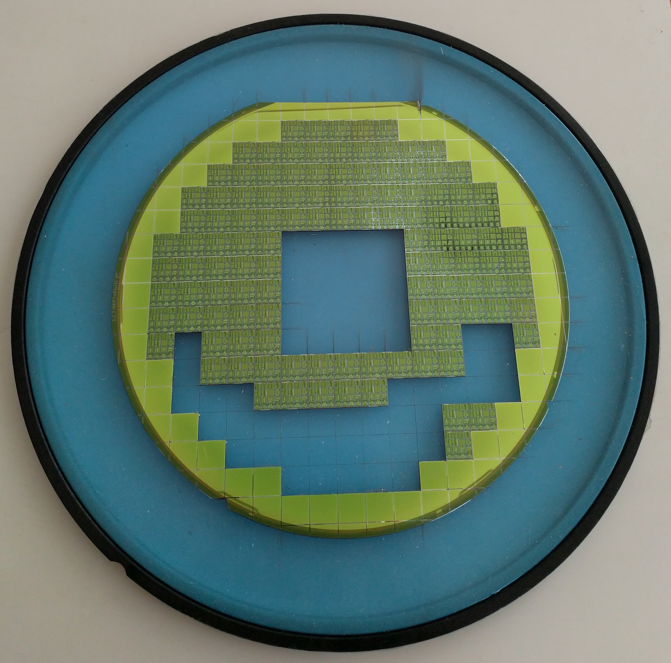
A semiconductor wafer on a dicing (blue) tape. Few chips (dies) from the wafer have already been picked up (removed) for further manufacturing.

== Historical development ==
The creation of dicing tape comes from the advancement of semiconductor manufacturing. In the beginning days of integrated circuit production, methods to separate die were very difficult. With the creation of dicing tape, mechanical methods became much easier.

According to Harry Fulton of IEEE, “Tape design over the past 40 years has continually evolved through advancements in both dicing technologies and the incessant revision of integrated circuit packaging.” The creation of a specifically designed polymer-based tape completely altered the dicing process.

== Material composition and properties ==
Modern dicing tapes mainly have two components: a backing material and an adhesive side. The backing materials also tend to have: PVC (offers strength and resistance to chemicals, polyolefin (stability) and polyethylene (moisture resistance). The adhesive layer varies depending on its use and application. According to materials scientist Giovanni Bovone, “The main focus is on engineering hydrogel adhesion through molecular design of the junctions to tailor the adhesion strength, reversibility, stability, and response to environmental stimuli.”

== Advanced tape technologies ==
=== UV-release tapes ===
UV-release tapes demonstrate one of the significant advancements in dicing technologies. These tapes use photosensitive adhesives that perform a chemical transformation when exposed to ultraviolet light. Furukawa electric describes the multiple tasks UV tape can handle, stating, “It is suitable to protect surface of semiconductor wafer during backgrinding process, and to hold semiconductor wafer with ring frame during dicing process. It is also applicable for various workpieces such as ceramics, glass, sapphire and so on.”

The equipment used for UV curing varies mainly on which manufacturer produces the product. With many different companies producing different products for separate tasks, it would be hard to find two tapes with similar chemical adhesion structures. Low-powered systems (1-10 mW/cm^2) is typically used for thin wafers or delicate die structures. Going up to medium-power systems (10-200 mW/cm^2), these tapes are typically used for commercial applications. Finally, high-power systems (greater than 200 mW/cm^2) require complete curing and minimal residue. UV exposure parameters must be carefully optimized for every application. Over exposure can lead to adhesive failure or unwanted chemical byproducts. Underexposure can also result in overly strong adhesion and potential die damage.

=== Thermal-release tapes ===
Thermal-release tapes are another important category for dicing tapes and are used in very specialized applications. These tapes focus on strong adhesions at room temperature, but chemically unbind when heated to different specific temperatures. These tapes are essential for processing required post-mount treatments like printing or cleaning. The thermal release mechanism allows for a very clean separation, without expositing components. These tapes are particularly valuable in the case of ceramic substances, circuit boards, and situations where UV exposure could damage the sensitive components. Most tapes activate between the temperatures of 90-170 degrees Celsius. The high floor allows for the prevention of accidental detachment, but it is low enough to easily release upon added heat.

== Application techniques and considerations ==
Applying dicing tape requires an extreme amount of precision. Modern facilities tend to use automated mounting equipment to apply the tape to wafer. This makes sure the tension and pressure are accurate. If air bubbles, contaminants, or uneven tension is applied to the dicing tape, it can lead to breakage or misalignment of the adhesion. There are many considerations to take in mind when applying dicing tape, such as environmental control (temperature and humidity), surface preparations (clean and proper friction), tension control (constant tension throughout application), and proper machinery (equipment may need to be changed based on tape and die).

== Industry challenges and innovations ==
The semiconductor industry, one of the main users of dicing tape, is evolving to thinner wafers, and more complicated structures. this has resulted many challenges for the dicing tape industry, and many advancements in dicing tape technology.

Some innovations have been created to address these challenges, such as:

- Low-outgassing formulations

Allows for maintaining yield in sensitive device manufacturing. Mainly used in optoelectronics and MEMS, traditional tapes an release volatile compounds that contaminate devices they are applied to.

- Pre-cut tape systems

Eliminates the need for manual cutting of tape, while also reducing particle generation.

- Water-soluble tapes

Used in very delicate applications, where some manufacturers need tapes to dissolve completely after use. Rather than having to peel off the tape, this dicing tape can dissolve in deionized water, reducing issues with tape separation.

== Environmental and safety considerations ==
Traditional dicing tapes present a few different environmental challenges. PVC-based dicing tapes are difficult to recycle, and well as have the potential to release the harmful adhesive compounds into the atmosphere. This safety concern for the environment was met with the transition to halogen-free and recyclable dicing tape, which allows for a safer environmental footprint.
