= InvenSense =

American microelectronics company

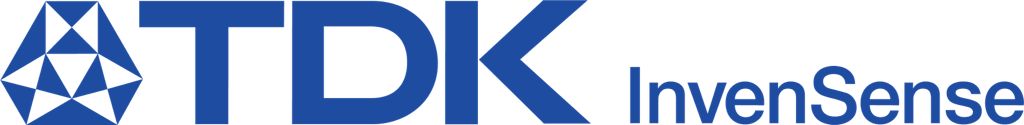
- Company type: Subsidiary
- Industry: Consumer Electronics
- Founded: 2003
- Founder: Steve Nasiri
- Headquarters: San Jose, California, US
- Key people: Omar Abed, CEO of InvenSense, Inc. and General Manager of TDK Corporation’s MEMS Sensors Business Group; Peter Hartwell, Chief Technology Officer; Joseph Bousaba, GM & VP – Motion and Pressure Business Unit; Fabio Pasolini, GM & VP – Emerging Sensors Business Unit; Eric Kawamoto, Vice President – Operations
- Products: SmartMotion, SmartSound, SmartSonic, SmartEnviro, SmartAutomotive, SmartPressure, SmartIndustrial, SmartBug
- Parent: TDK
- Website: invensense.tdk.com

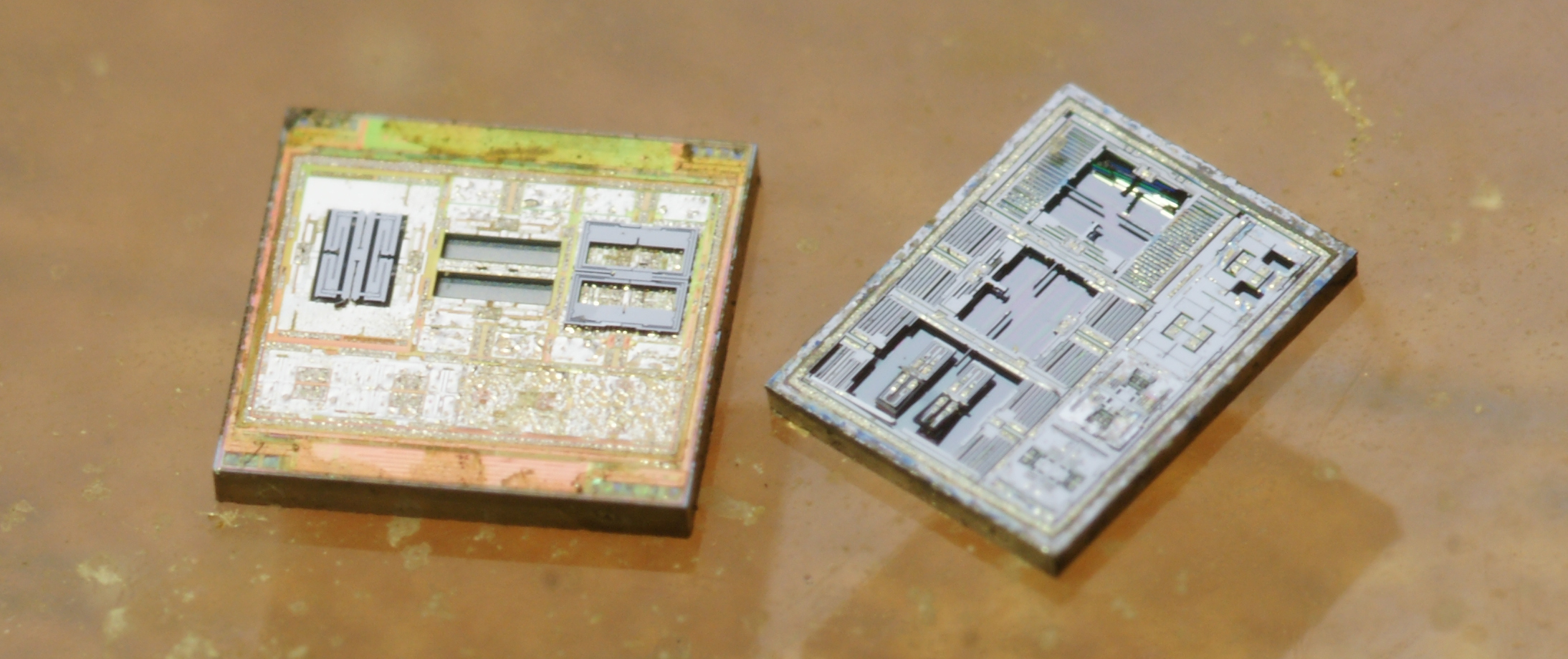
2 dies of Invensense MPU6050, an integrated gyroscope and accelerometer

InvenSense Inc. is an American consumer electronics company, founded in 2003 in San Jose, California by Steve Nasiri. It is the provider of the MotionTracking sensor system on chip (SoC) which functions as a gyroscope for consumer electronic devices such as smartphones, tablets, wearables, gaming devices, optical image stabilization, and remote controls for Smart TVs. InvenSense provides the motion controller in the Nintendo Wii game controller and the Oculus Rift DK1. Its motion controllers are found in the Samsung Galaxy smartphones and most recently in the Apple iPhone 6.

== History ==
Founded in 2003, InvenSense is headquartered in San Jose, California with offices in Wilmington, Massachusetts, China, Taiwan, Korea, Japan, France, Canada, Slovakia and Italy.

In December 2016, the company was acquired by electronics company TDK for US$1.3 billion. InvenSense became part of the MEMS Sensors Business Group in 2017. In February 2018, Chirp Microsystems joined InvenSense through its acquisition by TDK.

== Technical capabilities ==
InvenSense MotionTracking tracks complex user motions with the use of motion sensors such as microelectromechanical gyroscopes, (including 3-axis gyroscopes), accelerometers, compasses, and pressure sensors. The system then calibrates data, and creates a single data stream. With complex movement tracking comes a drain on battery life. In June 2014, the company announced a low power gyroscope chip that used just under six milliwatts of power in a chip and was just 0.75 millimeters thick.

InvenSense also provides Optical Image Stabilisation for smartphone cameras, which are important to detect hand movements and reduce shake in photographs. InvenSense's compact gyroscope was designed to provide antishake features on the smallest camera phones.

== See also ==
- List of system-on-a-chip suppliers
