= Brite Semiconductor =

Chinese fabless semiconductor company

- Industry: Semiconductors
- Founded: 2008
- Headquarters: Shanghai, China
- Key people: Dr. Charlie Zhi, President and CEO; Thomas Xu, Vice President of Operations; Dr. Zhiqing Zhuang, CEO
- Products: ASICs
- Owner: Semiconductor Manufacturing International Corporation
- Number of employees: 200 as of 2019
- Website: www.britesemi.com

Brite Semiconductor is a fabless semiconductor company founded in 2008 to develop custom ASIC designs. The company's top supplier and second largest shareholder is Semiconductor Manufacturing International Corporation.

== History ==
Brite Semiconductor was founded in July 2008 in Shanghai's Zhangjiang High-Tech Park; its investors include Semiconductor Manufacturing International Corporation (SMIC), Open-Silicon, Norwest Venture Partners, Gobi Partners, InterWest Partners and Pierre Lamond. Brite acquired its first successful 130 nm tape-out three months after its founding, its first 90 nm design win in September, and first 65 nm tape-out in October with the assistance of its leading strategic business partner and lead shareholder, Open-Silicon. In January 2009, Open-Silicon granted Brite license to its MAX technology. In April 2014, Synopsys announced that Brite Semiconductor will join the Synopsys IP OEM Partner Program. In December 2023, US senator Marco Rubio called for sanctions against Brite Semiconductor over its ties to the Chinese military industrial complex.
