= Teridian Semiconductor =

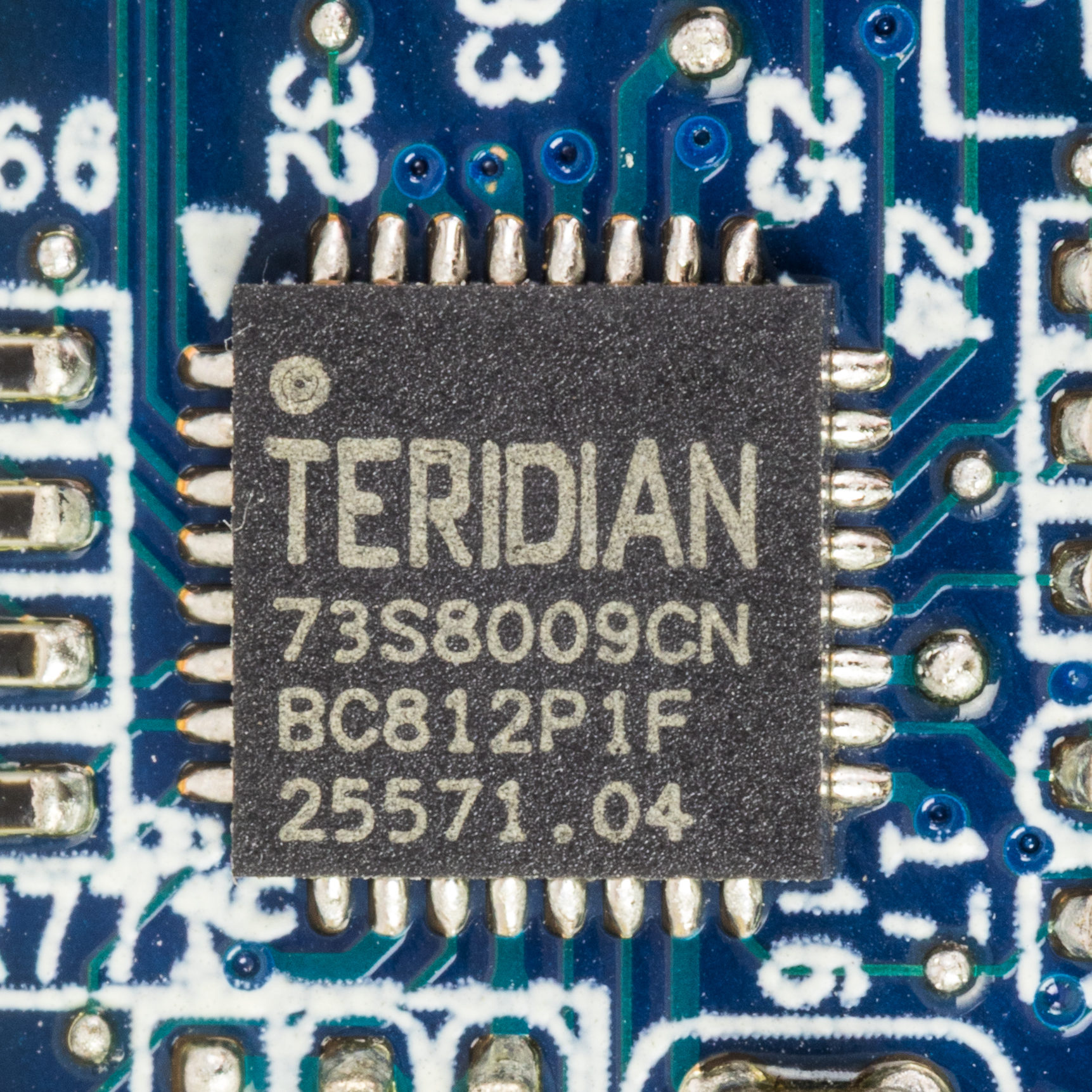
Teridian 73S8009CN - Combo ISO-7816 and USB Universal Smart Card Interface IC

Teridian Semiconductor Corporation (TSC) is a brand of mixed-signal ICs, primarily for energy-management markets that is manufactured by Silergy. It was formerly owned by Maxim Integrated Products.

== Products ==
Teridian metrology system-on-chip (SOC) solutions provide energy metering, measurement and control for the Smart Grid.

Other former Teridian products remain with Maxim Integrated, and included power-line communications, 10/100 Ethernet PHY, MAC+PHY, SFP Modules, VOIP FXO, PSTN soft modems with silicon DAA, smart-card interfaces and secure access controllers.

== Brief history ==
The business unit has been in existence for more than thirty years.

It began as Silicon Systems of Tustin, in Tustin, CA. An unusual vision of the original business was to provide complete solutions, including analog, digital, firmware and any large-systems software and drivers. It was reorganized and sold to Texas Instruments, reorganized, then parts of the business were sold to TDK Corporation, which moved it to nearby Irvine, CA. Teridian Semiconductor was formed on April 8, 2005, in a leveraged buyout arranged by Golden Gate Capital, a venture capital firm. Maxim Integrated Products acquired Teridian Semiconductor in April 2010 for $315 million in cash. The Teridian energy measurement products group was sold to Silergy on March 18, 2016, with some personnel remaining with Maxim to support other products. The acquisition was completed on 31 December 2015 for about $110 million, and was granted early termination on 25 February 2016 by the Federal Trade Commission.
