= MediaTek =

Taiwanese fabless semiconductor company

MediaTek Inc.
- Native name: 聯發科技
- Type: Public
- Traded as: TWSE: 2454
- Industry: Semiconductors; GPUs; Graphics cards; Consumer electronics; Computer hardware
- Founded: 28 May 1997; 29 years ago
- Headquarters: Hsinchu, Taiwan
- Area served: Worldwide
- Key people: Ming-Kai Tsai (chairman); Ching-Jiang Hsieh (vice chairman); Rick Tsai (CEO); Joe Chen (president)
- Products: Central processing units Graphics processing unit Chipsets; Microprocessors; Systems-on-chip (SoCs); Motherboard chipsets Network interface controllers Digital signal processors Digital light processors Integrated circuits Embedded processors Drivers
- Production output: 1.5 billion devices per year (2018) and 14% market-share of global smartphone sales (Q3 2017)
- Revenue: ▲NT$530.59 billion (2024)
- Operating income: ▲NT$102.41 billion (2024)
- Net income: ▲NT$107.14 billion (2024)
- Total assets: ▲NT$697.87 billion (2024)
- Total equity: ▲NT$405.06 billion (2024)
- Number of employees: 22,546 (As of Feb 28, 2025)
- Subsidiaries: Airoha Technology Corp.; EcoNet Wireless; Gaintech Co.; ILI Technology Corp.; MStar Semiconductor; Nephos Inc.; Ralink Technology, Corp.; Richtek Technology
- Website: mediatek.com

MediaTek Inc. (Chinese: 聯發科技股份有限公司; pinyin: Liánfā Kējì Gǔfèn Yǒuxiàn Gōngsī), sometimes informally abbreviated as MTK, is a Taiwanese fabless semiconductor company that designs and markets a range of semiconductor products, providing chips for wireless communications, high-definition television, handheld mobile devices like smartphones and tablet computers, navigation systems, consumer multimedia products and digital subscriber line services as well as optical disc drives.

Founded in 1997 and headquartered in Hsinchu, the company has 41 offices worldwide and was the third largest fabless chip designer worldwide in 2016. The company also provides its customers with reference designs. MediaTek became the biggest smartphone chipset vendor with 31% market share in Q3 2020. This was assisted by its strong performance in regions such as China and India.

== History ==
MediaTek was originally a unit of the Taiwanese firm, United Microelectronics Corporation (UMC), tasked with designing chipsets for home entertainment products. On May 28, 1997, the unit was spun off and incorporated. MediaTek Inc. was listed on the Taiwan Stock Exchange (TSEC) under the "2454" code on July 23, 2001.

The company started out designing chipsets for optical drives and subsequently expanded into chips for DVD players, digital TVs, mobile phones, smartphones and tablets. In general MediaTek has had a strong record of gaining market share and displacing competitors after entering new markets.

The company launched a division to design products for mobile devices in 2004 and developed chips such as the MT6225, MT6252, MT6235, and other chips in the MT62xx series, used in mobile phones. Seven years later, it took orders for more than 500 million mobile system-on-chip units per annum, including products for feature phones and smart devices. By providing extensive system engineering assistance, the company allowed many smaller companies and new entrants to enter a mobile phone market that had previously been dominated by large, often vertically integrated corporations that had long been broadly entrenched in the telecommunications industry. The mobile chip market quickly became the main growth driver for the company.

At Mobile World Congress 2014, MediaTek unveiled its new brand "Everyday Genius", dubbing the term "Super-mid market", with the vision and aiming to make smartphones more accessible affordable to the wider market.

As of November 2014, over 1500 mobile models accounting for 700 million units were shipped globally in 2014, using MediaTek chips, and the company posted revenues of US$5.3 billion in the first half of 2014, nearly as much as the whole of 2013. The revenue growth was however partly due to revenue recognition from the acquisition of MStar which became effective at the beginning of 2014.

In September 2019, MediaTek collaborated with VVDN Technologies to design, manufacture new-age AIoT solutions.

On November 25, 2019, MediaTek and Intel announced a partnership to bring 5G to PCs in 2021. MediaTek overtook Qualcomm as the largest vendor of smartphone chipsets in the world in the third quarter of 2020, mainly due to significant growth in the Indian and Latin American markets.

In May 2023, the company announced a new collaboration with Nvidia, using Dimensity to power advanced vehicle infotainment systems for automakers.

== Acquisitions ==
In 2005, MediaTek acquired Inprocomm, a wireless semiconductor design company producing 802.11a, b and a/g chips.

On September 10, 2007, MediaTek announced its intention to buy Analog Devices cellular radio and baseband chipset divisions for US$350 million. The acquisition was finalised by January 11, 2008.

On May 5, 2011, MediaTek acquired Ralink Technology Corporation, gaining products and expertise for Wi-Fi technology for mobile and non-mobile applications, as well as for wired DSL and Ethernet connectivity.

On April 11, 2012, MediaTek acquired Coresonic, a global producer of digital signal processing products based in Linköping, Sweden. Coresonic became a wholly owned subsidiary of MediaTek in Europe.

On June 22, 2012, MediaTek announced it would acquire a rival Taiwanese chipset designer MStar Semiconductor Inc., which held a strong market share position in digital television chips. The initial phase of the deal saw MediaTek taking a 48 percent stake, with an option to purchase the remaining stake later. The following merger between MediaTek and MStar was delayed by antitrust concerns in China and South Korea and finalized on February 1, 2014.

On September 7, 2015, MediaTek announced to buy Richtek Technology Corp., a fabless vendor of analog ICs and power management ICs based in Hsinchu, Taiwan. Richtek became a wholly subsidiary of MediaTek after the completion of the acquisition in the second quarter of 2016.

== Financial performance ==
Yearly net sales and operating income in million NT$
	2006	2007	2008	2009	2010	2011	2012	2013	2014	2015	2016	2017	2018	2019	2020	2021
Net sales	52,942	74,779	68,016	77,311	71,988	53,842	99,263	136,056	213,063 (Note: Includes sales contribution from MStar acquisition)	213,255	275,512	238,216	238,057	246,222	322,146	493,415
Income from operations	23,816	31,427	17,090	21,447	17,267	4,840	12,403	25,244	47,241	25,908	23,076	9,819	16,182	22,567	43,219	108,040

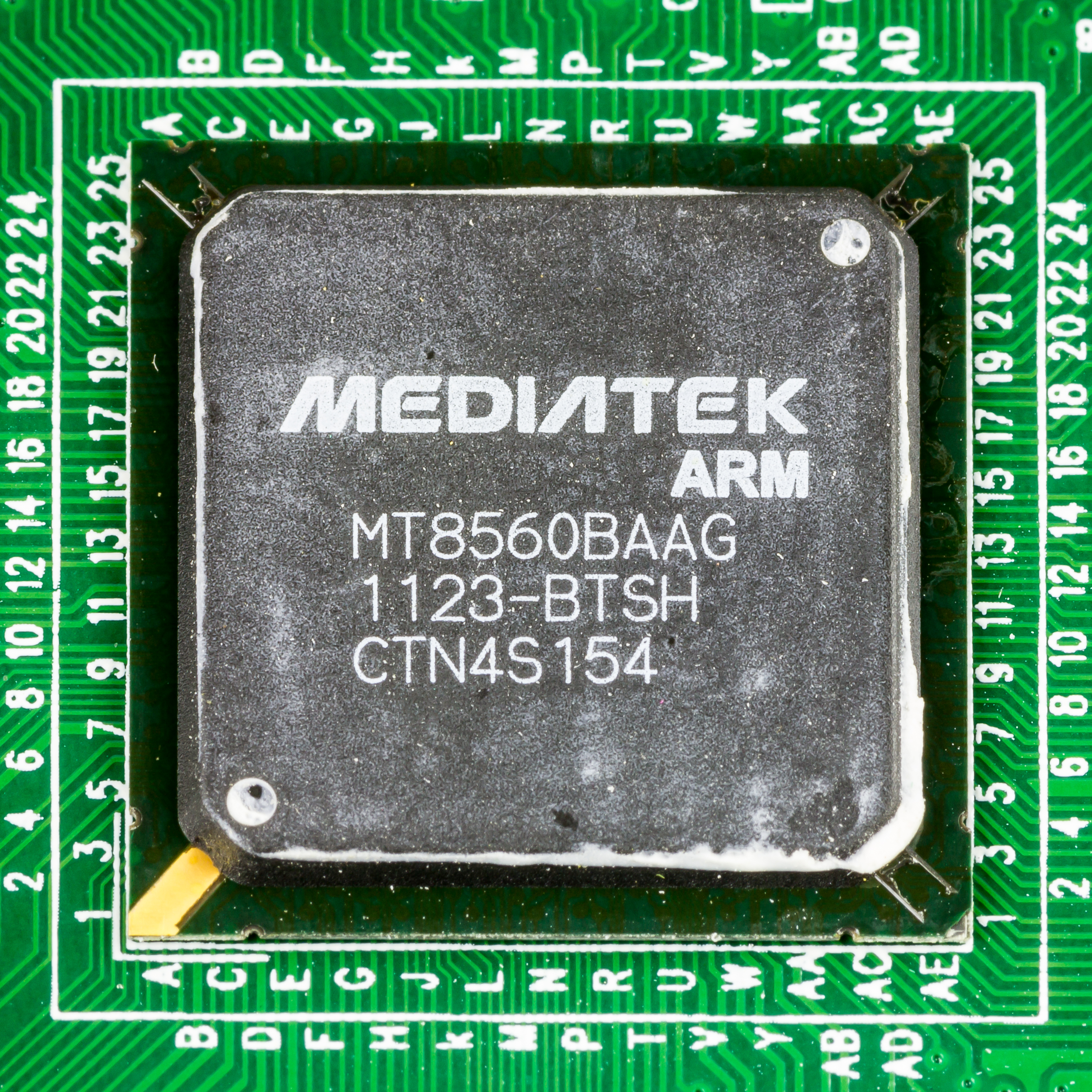
A MediaTek MT8560BAAG inside a Blu-ray player

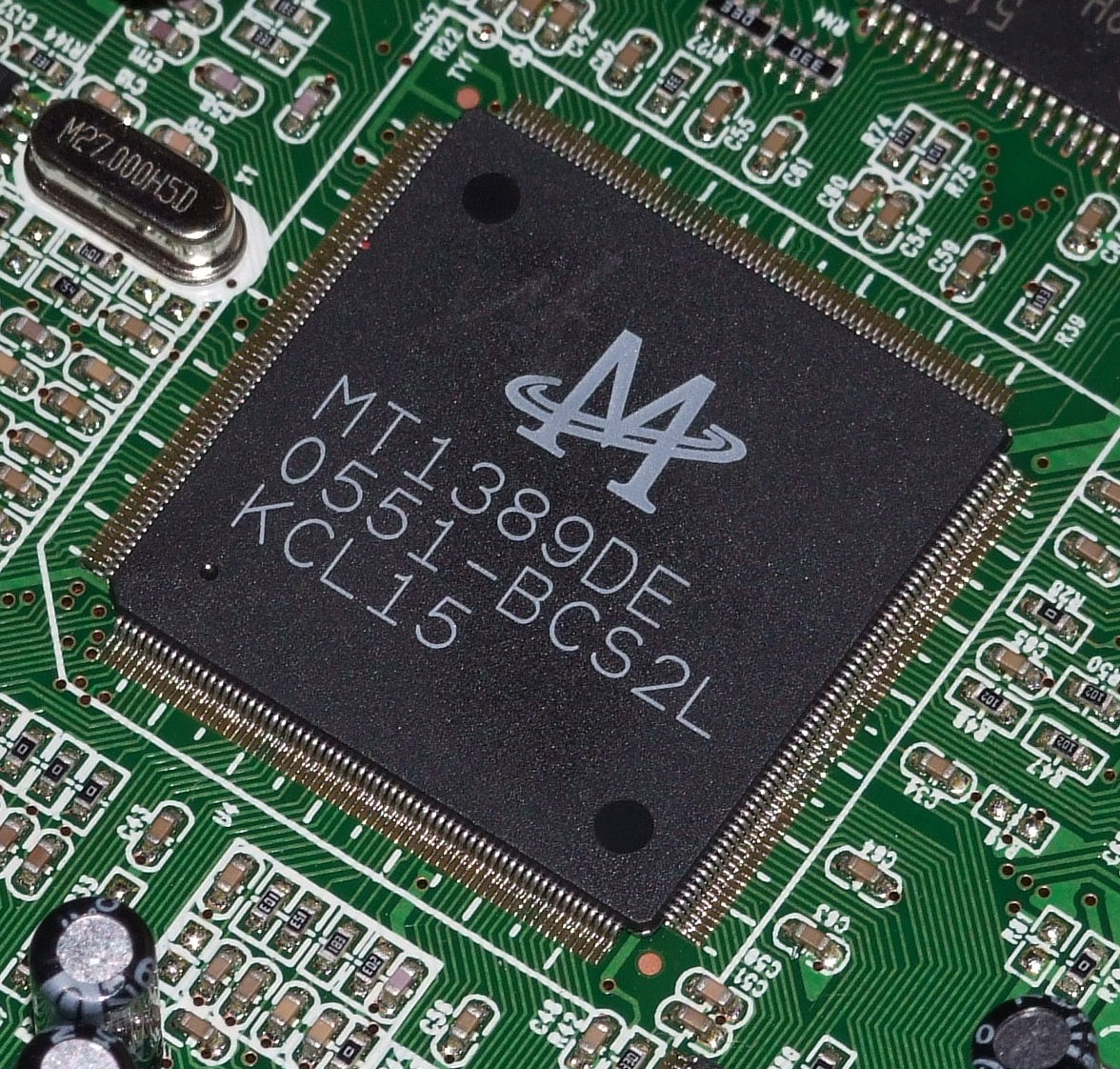
A Mediatek MT1389DE inside a DVD player

MediaTek's financial results have been subject to variation as the financial success of different product lines fluctuated. MediaTek's relatively strong sales in 2009/2010 were based on its strong market position for feature phone chipsets. Smartphone and tablet products contributed to MediaTek's sales and income increase in 2013, while revenue recognition from the acquisition of MStar Semiconductor, which became effective in February 2014, as well as a continuing strong position for smartphone and tablet solutions, were the main reasons for the sales growth seen in 2014. In 2014 smartphone chips accounted for approximately 50–55% of revenue, followed by digital home products (25–30%, includes digital television chips), tablet chips (5–10%), feature phone chips (5–10%) and Wi-Fi products (5–10%).

MediaTek started shipping chips with integrated 4G LTE baseband in volume in the second half of 2014, later than its largest competitor Qualcomm. The additional cost of the separate baseband chip required in every 4G handset made MediaTek's offerings more expensive and prompted some of its larger customers, like Alcatel One Touch and ZTE, to choose competing SoCs like the Qualcomm Snapdragon 400 and 410 platforms, negatively affecting MediaTek's revenue stream.

MediaTek's stock has been trading on the Taiwan Stock Exchange under the symbol TWSE: 2454.

A March 2021 report revealed that MediaTek had overtaken Qualcomm for the first time as the world's biggest smartphone chipset vendor in 2020, with 351.8 million chipsets shipped that year. The report attributed MediaTek's performance to its focus on less expensive smartphones. Market analyst firm Counterpoint predicted that MediaTek would maintain this lead in 2021, projecting a record of 37% in chip shipments.

== Product announcements ==
The MT8135 system-on-chip (SoC) for tablets announced in July 2013 was the industry's first chip to implement the new ARM big.LITTLE technology for heterogeneous multi-processing. A variant of the MT8135 was used by Amazon in its Kindle Fire HD tablet models. Also on November 20, 2013, MediaTek launched the MT6592 SoC, the first system-on-chip (SoC) with eight CPU cores which could be used simultaneously, in contrast to competing SoCs with eight physical cores of which only a subset could be active at any given time. The "True Octa-Core" trademark was registered to emphasize the difference in marketing materials.

On January 7, 2014, MediaTek announced the development of the world's first "multimode receiver" for wireless charging. In contrast to existing implementations it is compatible with both inductive and resonant charging. The resulting MT3188 wireless charging chip, certified by both the Power Matters Alliance and the Wireless Power Consortium was announced on February 24, 2014.

On February 25, 2014, MediaTek announced the MT6732, and the MT6630. The SoC MT6630 supports 802.11a/b/g/n/ac WiFi, Bluetooth, ANT+, GPS and FM radio.

On May 12, 2015, MediaTek announced its Helio X20, which features the industry's first tri-cluster CPU and the first CPU with a 10-core configuration. It also integrates MediaTek's first modem compatible with CDMA2000. Tri-cluster CPUs were later adopted by HiSilicon (Huawei) in 2018, Qualcomm and Samsung Exynos SoCs in 2019.

MediaTek collaborated with Google on the first Ultra HD TV platform for Android TV, resulting in the development of the MT5595 digital television SoC. The product first shipped in LCD TV models made by Sony.

On November 26, 2019, MediaTek announced its 5G SoC Dimensity 1000, the world's first mobile SoC supporting AV1.

On November 6, 2023, MediaTek announced its newest flagship chip, the Dimensity 9300. Besides an increase in performance and battery life, the newest chipset boasts to be AI-generative ready as well.

MediaTek is developing an Arm-based PC chip for Microsoft's Windows, set to launch after Qualcomm's exclusivity ends in 2024. This move aims to challenge Apple's Arm-based Macs and Intel's dominance in the PC market. Nvidia and AMD are also working on similar Arm-based designs for Windows. Nvidia launched its RTX Spark series in Computex 2026, co-developed in partnership with Mediatek.

On September 22, 2025, Mediatek launched the first Arm's C1 core based SoC Dimensity 9500. It features an All-big core design. The SoC is also first with 4 lane UFS 4.1.

== Corporate responsibility ==
MediaTek aims to achieve net zero emissions by 2050 and reduce overall carbon emissions as part of its commitment to sustainability.

In 2023, MediaTek launched the "Girls! TECH Action" project and invited Taiwanese students to the company's headquarters to promote interest in the industry and increase the number of female employees in the company.

In July 2024, the company's ESG risk rating was low at just 14.7%.

== Controversy ==
=== Benchmark cheating ===
On April 8, 2020, AnandTech published an article on MediaTek's Sports Mode; that same day, MediaTek published a post titled "Why MediaTek Stands Behind Our Benchmarking Practices". MediaTek said Sports Mode is designed to show full capabilities during benchmarks, that it is standard practice in the industry, and its device makers can choose to enable it or not. AnandTech pointed out Sports Mode was also being applied to benchmarks intended on measuring user experience benchmarks, providing otherwise untenable results, and that similar high performance modes from other device makers only turn on if chosen by the user, not from automatic app detection from a whitelist. The AnandTech article also noted that they had criticized other vendors such as Samsung Exynos and HiSilicon (Huawei) for past cheating practices.

On April 14, 2020, Qualcomm responded, saying they do not use whitelisting as they consider it cheating. On April 16, 2020, Oppo claimed that it tried to remove Sports Mode, but did not know it was still cached, hence it was removed in a firmware update. UL delisted several MediaTek Helio SoCs from its 3DMark and PCMark rankings.

== Product list ==
=== Modems ===
Model number	fab	Wireless radio technologies	Compatible with	Released
MT6280		DC-HSPA+, W-CDMA, TD-SCDMA, EDGE, and GSM/GPRS	MT2523	
MT6290	28 nm	LTE R9 (4G), DC-HSPA+, W-CDMA, TD-SCDMA, EDGE, and GSM/GPRS	MT6592, MT6582	2014 Q1
Helio M70 5G MT6297	7 nm	5G NR Sub-6 GHz, 5G NR mmWave, LTE		2020 Q1
M70 5G				2018 Q4
M80 5G				2021 Q1
T750				2021 Q4
T800				2022 Q4
T830				2022 Q3
M90 5G		5G sub-6GHz, mmWave, up to 12Gbps; satellite (NTN) connectivity		2025 Q1

=== GNSS modules ===
Global navigation satellite system (GNSS) modules.

- MT6628 (GPS) WLAN 802.11b/g/n, WIFI Direct, Bluetooth 4.0 LE, GPS/QZSS, FM
- MT6620 (GPS)
- MT3339 (2011) (GPS, QZSS, SBAS)
- MT3337 (GPS)
- MT3336 (GPS)
- MT3333/MT3332 (2013) GPS/GLONASS/GALILEO/BEIDOU/QZSS, is the world's first five-in-one multi-GNSS that supports the Beidou navigation satellite system.
- MT3329 (GPS)
- MT3328 (GPS)
- MT3318 (GPS)

=== IEEE 802.11 ===
As a result of the merger with Ralink, MediaTek has added wireless network interface controllers for IEEE 802.11-standards, and SoCs with MIPS CPUs to its product portfolio.

==== Wi-Fi ====
- MT7921AN Wi-Fi 6 PCI-E
- MT7922AN (RZ616) Wi-Fi 6E PCI-E
- MT7925AN (RZ717) Wi-Fi 7 PCI-E

== See also ==
- List of MediaTek processors
- List of companies of Taiwan
- List of semiconductor companies by country
