= Alchip =

Semiconductor manufacturer in Taipei, Taiwan

Alchip Technologies, Inc.
- Native name: 世芯電子股份有限公司
- Type: Public
- Traded as: TWSE: 3661
- Industry: Semiconductors
- Founded: 2003
- Headquarters: Taipei, Taiwan
- Key people: Kinying Kwan (Founder and Chairman), Johnny Shen (CEO)
- Products: ASIC
- Revenue: NT$30.482 billion (2023)
- Net income: NT$3.325 billion (2023)
- Total assets: NT$32.458 billion (2023)
- Total equity: NT$18.034 billion (2023)
- Number of employees: 574 (2023)
- Website: www.alchip.com

Alchip (Chinese: 世芯) is a fabless semiconductor company founded in 2003 and headquartered in Taipei, Taiwan. Alchip specializes in the design and manufacture of digital CMOS ASICs.

== Location ==
Alchip's headquarters is in Taipei, Taiwan. Alchip also has locations in Santa Clara, California in the US, Shin-Yokohama in Japan, Shanghai, Wuxi, Hefei and Jinan in China, and Hsinchu in Taiwan.

== History ==
In April 2002 Cadence acquired Simplex Solutions, an ASIC design services company. Alchip was founded six months later by Kinying Kwan and other former Simplex employees as a fabless ASIC supplier. Simplex Solutions had designed the graphics ASIC for Sony's PlayStation 2 game console. Sony became an important customer of Alchip as well. In 2006 80% of Alchip's revenues were from Japan, and most of that was from Sony. In September 2008 Alchip's relationship with Sony took another step forward when it was announced that it would partner with Sony's microelectronics to provide packaging solutions for Alchip's customer's ASICs. Over the past decade, Alchip has received investments from several tech heavyweights, including Global Future Group, Investar, AcerVC, Cisco Systems, C2Capital, and notably Taiwan Semiconductor Manufacturing Company (TSMC), the biggest contract chipmaker in the world, owns a 20% stake in the firm. On December 23, 2010, Alchip went public and was listed on the Taiwan Emergent Market under the stock ticker number 3661. On October 28, 2014, Alchip debuted on the Taiwan Stock Exchange's main market. This move opened Alchip to institutional and private investors and boosted its profile within the industry.

In April 2021 the US Government blacklisted seven Chinese supercomputing companies due to alleged involvement in supplying equipment to the PLA, Chinese military–industrial complex, and WMD programs. In response Alchip and TSMC suspended new orders from Chinese supercomputing company Tianjin Phytium Information Technology. Phytium accounted for 39% of Alchip's revenue.

== Products ==
Alchip provides physical design, design for test insertion, package design, product qualification, IP licensing, and manufacturing services for digital CMOS ASICs. Alchip has announced products in 180 nm, 130 nm, 90 nm, 65 nm, 40 nm, 32 nm, 28 nm, and 16 nm process technologies. Customer ASICs have been announced in a wide range of applications including medical image processing, supercomputing, crypto-mining and networking.

== Manufacturing ==
Alchip adopts an open foundry model and outsources semiconductor manufacturing to TSMC, UMC, SMIC, and Samsung. It also works with captive fab such as SONY and Toshiba. As of 2014, over 85% of Alchip projects are outsourced to TSMC. Alchip also outsources packaging, assembly, and testing. Alchip owns a Verigy 93K tester platform on which it performs test development and the test of ASIC prototypes.

== See also ==
- List of companies of Taiwan
- Semiconductor industry in Taiwan
