= Maxim Integrated =

American technology company

Maxim Integrated Products, Inc.
- Trade name: Maxim Integrated
- Type: Subsidiary
- Traded as: Nasdaq: MXIM
- Industry: Semiconductors
- Founded: 1983; 43 years ago
- Defunct: August 2021; 5 years ago
- Fate: Acquired by Analog Devices
- Headquarters: San Jose, California, U.S.
- Products: Integrated circuits
- Revenue: ▲US$2.632 billion (2021)
- Operating income: ▲US$945 million (2021)
- Net income: ▲US$827 million (2021)
- Total assets: ▲US$4.523 billion (2021)
- Total equity: ▲US$2.415 billion (2021)
- Number of employees: 7,100 (2020)
- Website: maximintegrated.com

Logo prior to September 2012

Maxim Integrated Products, Inc., was an American semiconductor company that designed, manufactured, and sold analog and mixed-signal integrated circuits for the automotive, industrial, communications, consumer, and computing markets. Maxim's product portfolio included power and battery management ICs, sensors, analog ICs, interface ICs, communications solutions, digital ICs, embedded security, and microcontrollers. The company was headquartered in San Jose, California, and had design centers, manufacturing facilities, and sales offices worldwide. In 2021, the company was acquired by Analog Devices.

== History ==
Maxim was founded in April 1983. The founding team included Jack Gifford, a semiconductor industry pioneer since the 1960s and co-founder of Advanced Micro Devices; Fred Beck, an IC sales and distribution pioneer; Dave Bingham, General Electric’s Scientist of the Year in 1982; Steve Combs, a pioneer in wafer technologies and manufacturing; Lee Evans, also a pioneer in CMOS analog microchip design and General Electric’s Scientist of the Year in 1982; Dave Fullagar, inventor of the first internally compensated operational amplifier circuit; Roger Fuller, a pioneer in CMOS microchip design; Rich Hood, development director for some of the first microprocessor-controlled semiconductor test systems; and Dick Wilenken, who is acknowledged as the father of key analog switch and multiplexer technologies.

Based on a two-page business plan, they obtained US$9 million in venture capital financing to establish the company.

In its first year, the company developed 24 second source products.

In 1985, the company introduced the MAX600.

Maxim recorded its first profitable fiscal year in 1987, with the help of the MAX232.

In 1988, the company became a public company via an initial public offering.

In 1989, the company purchased its first wafer fabrication facility, in Sunnyvale, California, from bankrupt Saratoga Semiconductor for only $5-million.

In 1994, the company acquired the integrated circuits division of Tektronix, based in Beaverton, Oregon, giving it high-speed bipolar processes for wireless RF and fiber-optic products.

In 1997, the company acquired a wafer fab in San Jose, California from IC Works for $42 million.

In April 2001, the company acquired Dallas Semiconductor in Dallas, Texas in a stock transaction, to gain expertise in digital and mixed-signal CMOS design, as well as an additional wafer fab.

In October 2003, the company acquired a submicrometre CMOS fab from Philips in San Antonio, Texas for $40 million to ramp up capacity and support processes down to the 0.25-micrometre level.

In May 2007, the company acquired an 0.18-micrometre fab from Atmel in Irving, Texas, for $38 million, approximately doubling fab capacity. In August 2007, it acquired Vitesse Semiconductor’s Storage Products Division in Colorado Springs, Colorado, adding Serial ATA (SATA), Serial Attached SCSI (SAS), and enclosure-management products to Maxim’s product portfolio.

From October 2007 to October 2008, Maxim's common stock was delisted from the Nasdaq Stock Exchange due to the company's inability to file financial statements related to stock option backdating. Maxim's stock was traded over-the-counter and quoted via Pink Sheets LLC until the company completed its restatement in 2008. Maxim's CFO Carl Jasper resigned due to an investigation into the issue by Maxim's board of directors. Maxim restated its earnings in September 2008 and was relisted on the Nasdaq Stock Exchange on October 8, 2008.

In 2008, the company acquired Mobilygen based in Santa Clara, California, to add H.264 video-compression technology to its portfolio.

In 2009, the company acquired Innova Card, headquartered in La Ciotat, France, to enrich its position in the financial transaction terminal semiconductor market. It also acquired two product lines from Zilog: the Secure Transactions product line, featuring the Zatara family and the hardware portion of Zilog's Wireless Control product line, commonly found in universal remote controls.

In 2010, the company acquired Teridian Semiconductor from Golden Gate Capital for $315 million. Teridian was a fabless semiconductor company based in Irvine, California, supplying System-on-a-chip (SoC) for the smart meter market. It also acquired Trinity Convergence Limited, a software company based in Cambridge, United Kingdom, a part of the ecosystem to bring Skype video conferencing to the LCD TV market. It also acquired Phyworks, a supplier of optical transceiver chips for the broadband communications market, for $72.5 million.

In November 2010, the company shipped its first analog product on a 300mm wafer.

In July 2011, the company acquired SensorDynamics, a semiconductor company that develops proprietary sensor and microelectromechanical systems. Also in 2011, it acquired Cambridge Analog Technologies, a company based in Billerica, Massachusetts, that focused on licensing analog designs including low power ADCs and other analog blocks.

In 2012, the company acquired Genasic Design Systems, a fabless RF chip company that makes chips for LTE applications.

In October 2013, the company acquired Volterra Semiconductor, a manufacturer of power management equipment.

In February 2018, the company acquired Icron Technologies, a manufacturer of USB and video extension products.

In June 2020, the company acquired Trinamic, a producer of motion control products.

On August 26, 2021, the company was acquired by Analog Devices.
