= Open-Silicon =

- Industry: Semiconductors
- Founded: 2003
- Founders: Dr. Naveed Sherwani, Dr. Satya Gupta, Scott Houghton
- Headquarters: Milpitas, California, United States
- Products: ASICs, system-on-a-chip, integrated circuits
- Number of employees: 400 (2013)
- Website: www.open-silicon.com at the Wayback Machine (archived March 17, 2009)

Open-Silicon was an American semiconductor company based in California that was founded in 2003. The company was a fabless semiconductor company that focused on custom system on chip (SoC) designs.

Open-Silicon was acquired by SiFive in September 2021 and was renamed as OpenFive. The unit was subsequently sold by SiFive in March 2022 to Alphawave Semi.

== Corporate history ==
Open-Silicon was founded in 2003 by Naveed Sherwani, Satya Gupta and Scott Houghton. Initial funding was provided by Sequoia Capital, Norwest Venture Partners, and InterWest Partners. In December 2007 Unicorn Investment Bank acquired 75% of Open-Silicon for $190M, with the rest of the company employee-owned.

In May 2007, Open-Silicon acquired Zenasis Technologies, a maker of processor optimization EDA software. This technology has also been expanded by Open-Silicon to focus on low power design and process variability management.

In 2009 Open-Silicon acquired design services firm Silicon Logic Engineering (SLE). This acquisition has enhanced the company's derivative IC design capabilities. In 2010 the company opened new facilities in Research Triangle Park, North Carolina, and Pune, India, to provide additional support for derivative IC design.

Open-Silicon's business model for its ASIC development process was called the OpenMODEL. In 2012, Open-Silicon acquired and grew substantial design operations in Pakistan and Taiwan.

On August 17, 2020, SiFive acquired Open-Silicon and renamed it OpenFive, an independent business unit of SiFive. On Sept. 1, 2022, Canadian semiconductor licensing company Alphawave Semi acquired SiFive’s OpenFive business unit for $210 million.
