= Boise State Broncos tennis =

College Tennis in Idaho

- University: Boise State University
- Head coach: Luke Shields (2022 - Present, season)
- Conference: Pac-12
- Location: Boise, Idaho, US
- Home Court: Appleton Tennis Center; Boas Tennis/Soccer Complex
- Nickname: Broncos
- Colors: Blue and orange

The Boise State Broncos tennis program represents Boise State University in the Pac-12 Conference. The program has a long history, several notable accomplishments and has several notable alumni.

== Current coaching staff ==
Name	Position	Years at BSU
Greg Patton	Men's; Head coach	8
Morgan Shepherd	Men's; Assistant head coach	3
Mark Tichenor	Women's; Head coach	6
Hadley MacFarlane	Women's; Assistant head coach	1

== Head coaches ==
Name	Years	Seasons	Won	Lost	Tie	Pct.
Greg Patton	1994–1997	6	70	36	2	.657
[[??]]	1998–2002	0	0	0	0	.000
Greg Patton	2003–present	23	355	254	0	.583
All-Time		54	799	477	2	.625

== Year-by-year Conference results Men ==
Season	Coach	Record		Notes
Season	Coach	Overall	Conference	Notes
Western Athletic Conference
1954?	Coach	0–0	0–0	
1990	Kent DeMars	17–9	—	Metro Tournament Champions; NCAA Sweet 16
1991	Kent DeMars	17–9	—	Metro Tournament Champions; NCAA Quarterfinals
Southeastern Conference
1992	Kent DeMars	8–14	3–8	
1993	Kent DeMars	11–11	3–8	
1994	Greg Patton	19–8	6–5	
1995	Greg Patton	12–16	1–10	NCAA First Round
1996	Greg Patton	13–11	3–8	NCAA First Round
1997	Greg Patton	17–10	4–7	NCAA Third Round
1998	Kent DeMars	21–8	5–6	NCAA Sweet 16
1999	Kent DeMars	18–12	5–6	NCAA Second Round
2000		10–13	3–8	NCAA Second Round
Western Athletic Conference
2001		0–0	0–0	NCAA First Round
2002	Kent DeMars	0–0	0–0	NCAA Second Round
2003	Greg Patton	0–0	0–0	NCAA First Round
2004	Greg Patton	0–0	0–0	NCAA First Round
2005	Greg Patton	0–0	0–0	NCAA Sweet 16 WAC Tennis Champions
2006	Greg Patton	14–15	5–6	NCAA First Round
2007	Greg Patton	0–0	0–0	

=== Conference championships ===
Year	Championship	Record
1973	Big Sky Conference	0–0 (0–0)
1974	Big Sky Conference	0–0 (0–0)
1999	Big West Conference	0–0 (0–0)
2000	Big West Conference	0–0 (0–0)
2002	Western Athletic Conference	0–0 (0–0)
2003	Western Athletic Conference	0–0 (0–0)
2004	Western Athletic Conference	11–1 (8–0)
2005	Western Athletic Conference	9–4 (7–1)
2006	Western Athletic Conference	18–6 (0–0)
2007	Western Athletic Conference	0–0 (0–0)
2008	Western Athletic Conference	0–0 (0–0)
2009	Western Athletic Conference	0–0 (0–0)

== Year-by-year Conference results Women ==
Season	Coach	Record		Notes
Season	Coach	Overall	Conference	Notes
Western Athletic Conference
1954?	Coach	0–0	0–0	
1990	Kent DeMars	17–9	—	Metro Tournament Champions; NCAA Sweet 16
1991	Kent DeMars	17–9	—	Metro Tournament Champions; NCAA Quarterfinals
Southeastern Conference
1992	Kent DeMars	8–14	3–8	
1993	Kent DeMars	11–11	3–8	
1994	Greg Patton	19–8	6–5	
1995	Greg Patton	12–16	1–10	NCAA First Round
1996	Greg Patton	13–11	3–8	NCAA First Round
1997	Greg Patton	17–10	4–7	NCAA Third Round
1998	Kent DeMars	21–8	5–6	NCAA Sweet 16
1999	Kent DeMars	18–12	5–6	NCAA Second Round
2000		10–13	3–8	NCAA Second Round
Western Athletic Conference
2001		0–0	0–0	NCAA First Round
2002	Kent DeMars	0–0	0–0	NCAA Second Round
2003	Greg Patton	0–0	0–0	NCAA First Round
2004	Greg Patton	0–0	0–0	NCAA First Round
2005	Greg Patton	0–0	0–0	NCAA Sweet 16 WAC Tennis Champions
2006	Greg Patton	14–15	5–6	NCAA First Round
2007	Greg Patton	0–0	0–0	
2007	Greg Patton	0–0		

== NCAA tourney appearances and results ==
Year and bowl	Winning team		Losing team
1999	Boise State	0	0

== Conference championships ==
Year	Championship	Record	Champions
1973	Big Sky Conference	0–0 (0–0)	
1974	Big Sky Conference	0–0 (0–0)	
1999	Big West Conference	0–0 (0–0)	
2000	Big West Conference	0–0 (0–0)	
2002	Western Athletic Conference	0–0 (0–0)	
2003	Western Athletic Conference	0–0 (0–0)	#1
2004	Western Athletic Conference	11–1 (8–0)	
2005	Western Athletic Conference	9–4 (7–1)	
2006	Western Athletic Conference	0–0 (0–0)	
2007	Western Athletic Conference	0–0 (0–0)	
2008	Western Athletic Conference	0–0 (0–0)	

== Honors ==
=== College Tennis Hall of Famers ===
==== Players ====
- Greg Patton – Player, 1900–1900

== Current ATP players ==
- Wesley Moodie – Men's, 1998–2000

== Current WTA players ==
- Name – S;D;M

== Notable former tennis players ==
Former BSU Tennis players that have become notable outside of tennis.

=== Men ===
- Steve Appleton – 1978–1982
