= Alfred Jost (inventor) =

German inventor and entrepreneur (born 1957)

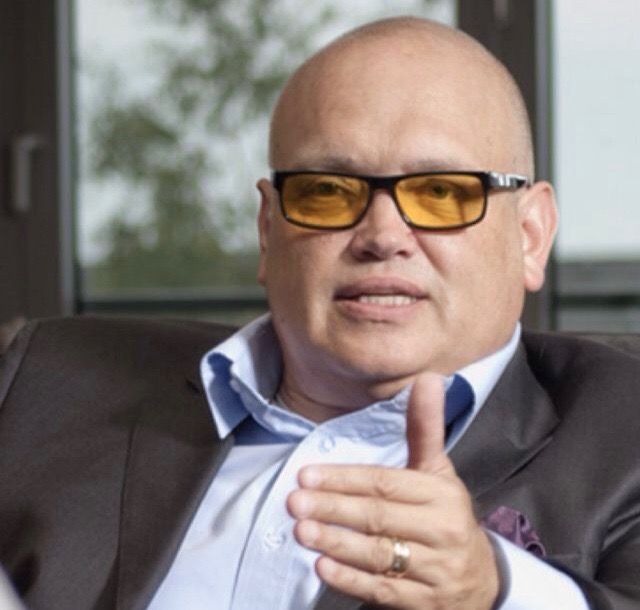
Alfred Jost

Alfred Jost (born January 2, 1957) is a German inventor and entrepreneur. He is the founder of Solar Bankers and the inventor of a patented concentrating technology solar module. Mr. Jost is an international expert in the solar market, market economy and corporate business. As a former investment banker, Mr. Jost has successfully founded and managed more than 10 companies, with cumulative profits greater than $100 million.

== Biography ==
In 2008, Jost invented and has since been working on the development of an internationally patented solar module that manages light and increases the efficiency of the panel. He founded and became CEO of the company Solar Bankers. Utilizing his patented solar module, which is constructed with nanostructured holographic film, Jost has been structuring the distribution and project development for solar energy projects in the United States, Sri Lanka, South Africa, Vietnam, China, and MENA/GCC.

With Solar Bankers, consumers join a Peer-to-Peer Network and can produce their own electricity by using a Solar Node and sell any excess at competitive prices to their neighbours via local marketplaces.

In 2017 Mr. Jost was chosen by DFA (Dubai Future Accelerator) to set up a pilot installation for his nano structured Solar Module under desert conditions.

Being an international keynote speaker on topics such as Blockchain Technology/DLT, the tokenisation of commodities, the future of renewable energy and sustainability, Jost brings awareness to global audiences from different areas of business in Dubai, China, Germany, USA, UK, Korea, Austria, Mexico and Puerto Rico.

Prior to 1991, Jost worked at J.P. Morgan as the Head of Product Development and Structured Finance in Frankfurt, Germany and London, United Kingdom.

From 1992 to 2000, Jost acquired IFA-Spare Parts Division in Ludwigsfelde, Germany, a company with 200 employees. The company supplied worldwide repair parts for the IFA-truck types W50 and L60 in cooperation with Mercedes-Benz and Thyssen.

In 2001, Jost was appointed by Mercedes-Benz to organize and implement the sequencing logistics of the stock receipt for their company. He sold his company to a spin-off of Quandt in 2007.

In 1992, Jost was the managing director of WEMEX in Berlin, Germany. WEMEX, a previous foreign trade company of the GDR (German Democratic Republic), which traded machine tools in cooperation with the Hörmann-Group.

Jost acquired a supplier of non-food products to gas stations from Metro AG in 1995. He sold the company to Lekkerland in 1997. In 1996, Jost acquired AEG (high voltage systems) from Daimler-Benz in Magdeburg, Germany. He sold the company to industrial investors in 1998.

From 2008 through 2010, Alfred Jost worked with the development and execution of concepts to rescue Qimonda at the request of the Ministry of Economy and Labor of Saxony. They worked closely on the concept in the semiconductor business.
