= Sanjay Mehrotra =

Indian-American business executive and CEO of Micron

Dato' Sanjay Mehrotra DSPN
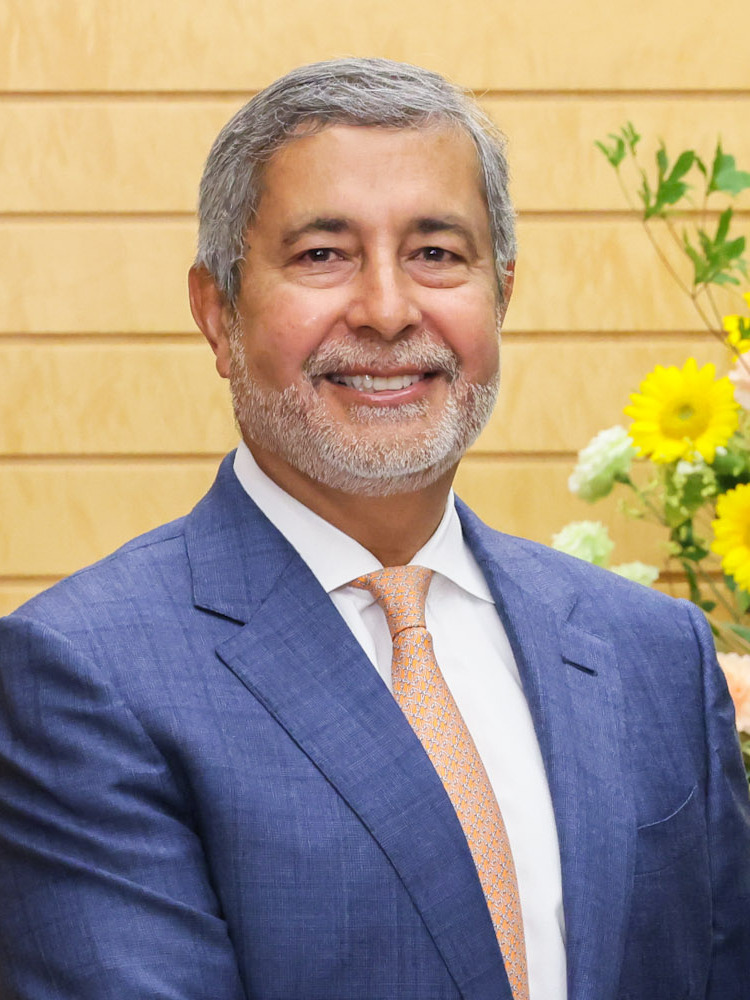
- Mehrotra in 2025
- Born: June 27, 1958 (age 68); Kanpur, Uttar Pradesh, India
- Education: BITS Pilani; University of California, Berkeley (BS, MS)
- Title: CEO of Micron
- Spouse: Sangeeta Mehrotra
- Children: 2

Sanjay Mehrotra is an Indian-American business executive and the CEO of Micron Technology. He was a co-founder of SanDisk, and its president and CEO from 2011 until its acquisition by Western Digital in 2016.

== Early life and education ==
Mehrotra was born in 1958 in Kanpur, India. He is the youngest of four siblings. His father was a liaison officer in the cotton industry, who later moved the family to New Delhi when Mehrotra was ten years old. At an early age, Mehrotra began expressing interest in math and science, and he has since said that his father and siblings played a significant role in encouraging him to pursue an education in STEM. As a teenager, he began taking mechanical courses in school and eventually transferred over to Sardar Patel Vidyalaya, a top-ranking high school in New Delhi.

Mehrotra has said that it was his father’s dream to see him continue his education in the U.S., so he committed himself to applying to American universities. At the age of 18, Mehrotra moved to the U.S., transferring from BITS Pilani to attend the University of California, Berkeley, where he earned his bachelor’s degree and master’s degree in Electrical Engineering and Computer Science.

He graduated in 2009 from Stanford University Graduate School of Business Executive Education Program.

In 2022, the National Academy of Engineering elected Mehrotra as a member for his contributions to nonvolatile memory design and architecture enabling multilevel cell NAND flash products. Mehrotra holds more than 70 patents. He has published articles in the area of non-volatile memory design and flash memory systems.

He has more than 35 years of experience in the non-volatile semiconductor memory industry, including engineering and management positions at SanDisk, Micron, Integrated Device Technology, SEEQ Technology, Intel, and Atmel.

== SanDisk ==
Mehrotra co-founded SanDisk in 1988 and was president and CEO from 2011 until 2016. He previously was executive vice president and chief operating officer, senior vice president of engineering, vice president of product development and director of memory design and product engineering.

== Micron ==
Following the announcement of Mark Durcan's retirement in February 2017, Mehrotra was named chief executive officer. His appointment became effective May 8, 2017, with Durcan as an adviser to the company until early August 2017.

While CEO at Micron, Mehrotra was appointed 2019 chairman of the Semiconductor Industry Association, the primary advocacy organization for the U.S. semiconductor industry.

== Awards ==
Mehrotra has received the following awards and honors:

- "IEEE Reynold B. Johnson Data Storage Device Technology Award" (with SanDisk co-founders Ei Harari and Jack Yuan) for "leadership in the development and commercialization of Flash electrically erasable programmable read-only memory-based data storage products", 2006.
- "CEO of the Year" from the Entrepreneur's Foundation of Silicon Valley in recognition of his leadership in advancing SanDisk's community service activities, December 10, 2013.
- "Distinguished Alumni Award in Electrical Engineering" from the University of California, Berkeley, 2013.
- Mehrotra delivered the 2014 University of California, Berkeley Graduate Engineering School commencement address.
- "Distinguished Lifetime Achievement Award" from the Chinese Institute of Engineers USA at the 13th annual Asian American Engineer of the Year Award ceremony March 1, 2014.
- Mehrotra was honored by the American India Foundation for "personal philanthropic efforts and for leading SanDisk's programs to advance educational opportunities for young people from disadvantaged backgrounds, March 21, 2015.
- "Philanthropic CEO of the Year" from the American Red Cross Silicon Valley for his "remarkable impact toward fulfilling [the] mission to prevent and alleviate human suffering locally, nationally and internationally," October 24, 2015.
- 2019 Flash Memory Summit Lifetime Achievement Award for “co-founding SanDisk, advancing the architecture that enabled the industry and market for flash memory, and leadership of Micron Technology, Inc. and the Semiconductor Industry Association.”
- Malaysian Order of Loyal Defender of the State medal, 2021.
- University of California, Berkeley "Spirit of 1868 Volunteer Award," 2021.
- Mehrotra was inducted into the National Academy of Engineering in 2022, one of the highest distinctions in the profession.
- Boise State University awarded an honorary doctorate to Mehrotra at the university's 110th commencement ceremony in 2022. During the ceremony, Mehrotra gave the keynote commencement address.
- Mehrotra received the Semiconductor Industry Association’s Robert N. Noyce Award, one of the industry’s highest honors, in 2023 for his contributions to the semiconductor industry.
- The Indian Institute of Management Mumbai honored Mehrotra with the Lakshya Business Visionary Award in 2023.
- The Rochester Institute of Technology conferred an Honorary Doctorate of Humane Letters to Mehrotra in 2024.

== Activities ==
In April 2014, Mehrotra along with Shankar Sastry, dean and Carlson professor of engineering at UC Berkeley, opened the SanDisk Computing Lab at the College of Engineering at the University of California, Berkeley. The lab was funded by a $1 million donation by SanDisk to the College of Engineering. The donation also funded recently completed renovations to Cory Hall, home of the College's Department of Electrical Engineering and Computer Sciences.

As of 2024, Mehrotra is on the board of directors for Micron Technology, CDW, and the Semiconductor Industry Association.
