= Inotera =

Inotera Memories, Inc.
- Industry: Semiconductors
- Founded: January 2003
- Defunct: 2016
- Fate: Acquired by Micron
- Headquarters: Guishan, Taoyuan City, Taiwan
- Products: DRAM
- Parent: Micron Technology
- Website: www.inotera.com

Inotera Memories, Inc. (Chinese: 華亞科技; pinyin: huā yǎ kē jì) was a company incorporated as a joint venture between Nanya Technology Corporation and Infineon (later Qimonda) in Taiwan in January 2003. The company was acquired by Micron Technology in 2016. It was renamed to Micron Technology Taiwan, Inc. and became one of Micron's manufacturing locations.

== History ==
In 2008, Micron Technology acquired a 35.5% stake in Inotera from Qimonda as Qimonda underwent restructuring. The Company reached full conversion to 70 nm shrink technology at the end of June 2008 and started pilot production of Micron’s 50 nm stack process technology from the third quarter of 2009 in order to further improve the productivity and to reduce manufacturing unit cost.

In January 2013, Micron announced an amendment to the joint development agreement with Nanya that gave Micron access to all of Inotera's manufacturing output based on market pricing.

In December 2016, Micron completed the acquisition at a transaction value of approximately US$4.0 billion.
