= IM Flash Singapore =

Semiconductor company

IM Flash Singapore LLP
- Type: Non-public
- Industry: Semiconductor integrated circuitry
- Founded: 2007
- Fate: Intel's stake acquired by Micron Technology in April 2012. Company became wholly owned by Micron.
- Headquarters: Singapore

IM Flash Singapore LLP is a semiconductor company located in Singapore.

== History ==
IM Flash SIngapore was founded in February 2007, by Micron Technology and Intel Corporation. The joint-venture was set up to produce NAND Flash memory for the 2 owners, and was the second site set up, after the success of IM Flash Technologies. It was located in Senoko, Singapore.

It was planned to begin operations in late 2008, but due to the 2008 financial crisis, all 800 employees were retrenched. The plant, which had completed construction, was idled as the capital equipment had not moved into the plant.

In 2010, preparations were made to start production by end of that year, as the IM Flash Technologies plant had reached maximum capacity. It officially opened in April 2011.

On February 28, 2012, Micron and Intel announced that they would expand their NAND Flash memory joint venture relationship, to increase the flexibility and efficiency of the joint venture. Intel would sell its stake in IM Flash Singapore to Micron, along with its share of IM Flash Technologies assets in Micron's Manassas, Virginia plant.

While the IMFS assets have been sold to Micron, there is an option in place for Micron to purchase Intel's interest in IMFT, per the disclosure in the company's 10Q SEC filing, 30 June 2012. The deal was completed in 2019 where Intel received $1.5 billion and Micron will sell them 3D XPoint memory wafers until the end of 2020.

As a result, IM Flash Singapore became wholly owned by Micron and became its fourth facility in Singapore.
