= IM Flash Technologies =

Former Micron-Intel joint venture

IM Flash Technologies, LLC
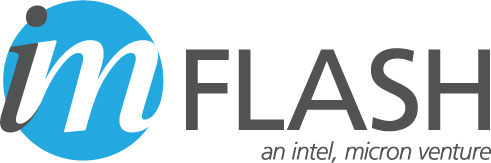

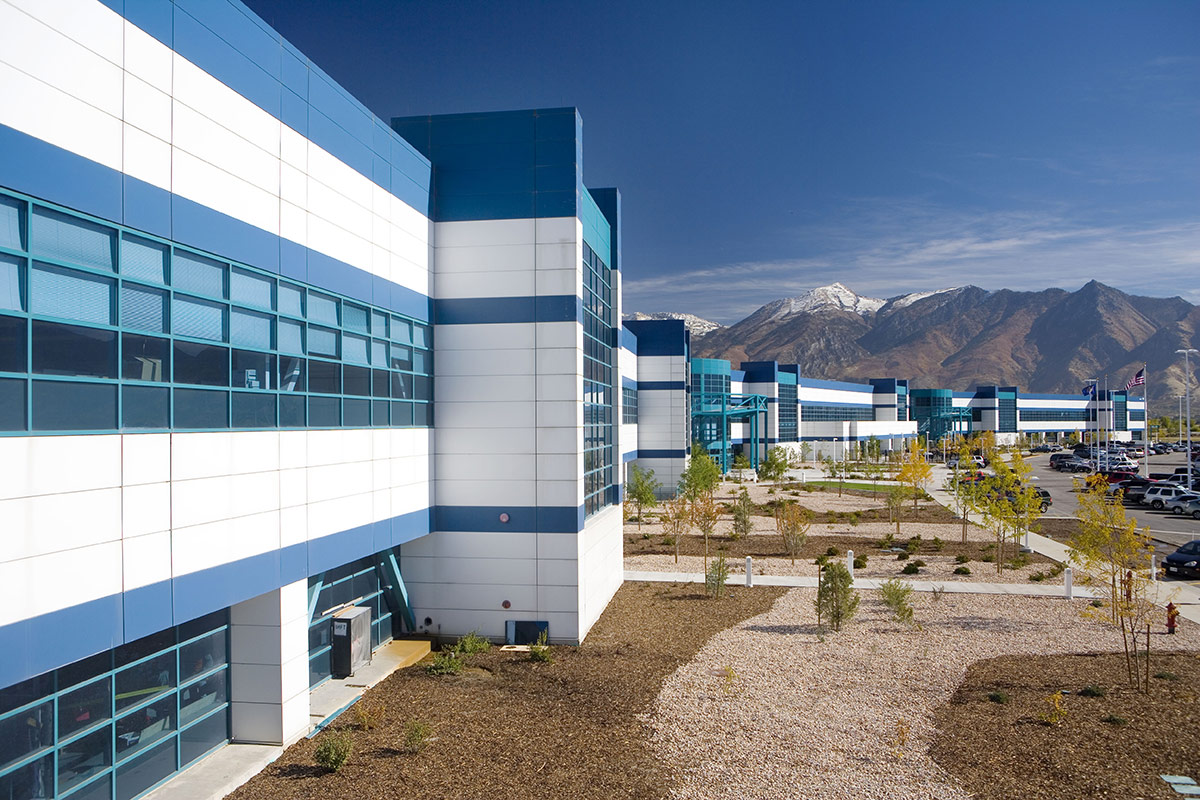
- Exterior of IM Flash Technologies, Lehi, Utah, USA, in 2013
- Company type: Joint Venture
- Industry: Semiconductor integrated circuitry
- Founded: 2006; 20 years ago
- Defunct: October 31, 2019; 6 years ago
- Fate: Acquired by Micron Technology
- Headquarters: Lehi, Utah, United States
- Key people: David Cheffings and Bert Blaha
- Number of employees: 1,500 - 2,000
- Website: Archived October 26, 2019, at the Wayback Machine

IM Flash Technologies, LLC was the semiconductor company founded in January 2006, by Intel Corporation and Micron Technology, Inc. IM Flash produced 3D XPoint used in data centers and high end computers. It had a 300mm wafer fab in Lehi, Utah, United States.

It built a second 300mm wafer fab, IM Flash Singapore, which opened in April 2011. IM Flash took the leading edge in NAND flash scaling by moving to 34 nm design rules in 2008. IM Flash has been able to devise 25-nm NAND chips with 193-nm immersion lithography, plus self-aligned double-patterning (SADP) techniques, where it is widely believed that it is using scanners from ASML Holdings NV and SADP technology. In 2011 IM Flash moved to a 20 nm process– which was the smallest NAND flash technology at the time.

On July 16, 2018, Micron and Intel announced that they would cease joint development of 3D XPoint after the 2nd generation technology is finalized, which is expected to be completed in the first half of 2019. Technology development beyond the 2nd generation will be pursued independently by the two companies in order to optimize the technology for their respective product and business needs. The two companies will continue to manufacture memory based on 3D XPoint technology at the Intel-Micron Flash Technologies (IMFT) facility in Lehi, Utah.

On October 18, 2018, Micron announced their intention to exercise its right to call the remaining interest in the parties' joint venture, IM Flash Technologies, LLC. Micron is to exercise the call option starting January 1, 2019 and the timeline to close the transaction is between six and twelve months after the date Micron exercises the call. At the time of close, Micron expects to pay approximately $1.5 billion in cash for the transaction, dissolving Intel's non-controlling interest in IM Flash as well as IM Flash member debt, which was approximately $1 billion as of Aug. 30, 2018.

On October 31, 2019, Micron closed the acquisition of all of Intel's stake in IM Flash Technologies. IM Flash Technologies is now legally known as Micron Technology Utah, LLC.

On October 22, 2021, Texas Instruments purchased the Lehi fab for $900 million.
