= Micron Technology =

American computer memory manufacturer

Micron Technology, Inc.
- Micron logo since 2024

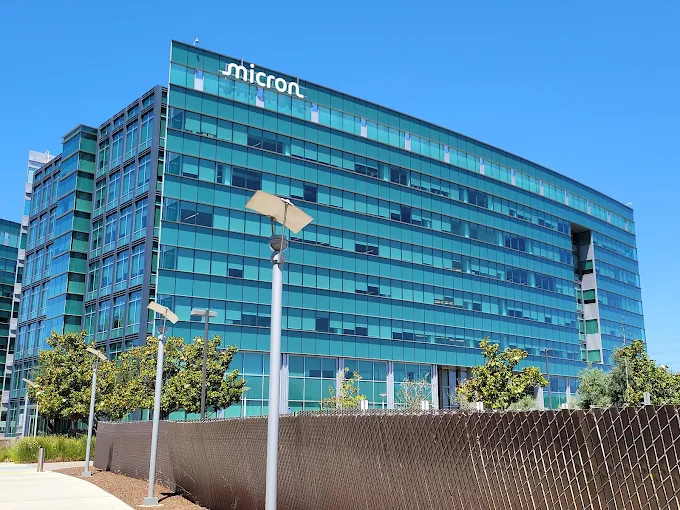
- Micron's campus in San Jose, California
- Type: Public
- Traded as: Nasdaq: MU; Nasdaq-100 component; S&P 100 component; S&P 500 component
- Industry: Semiconductors
- Founded: October 5, 1978; 48 years ago
- Founders: Ward Parkinson; Joe Parkinson; Dennis Wilson; Doug Pitman
- Headquarters: Boise, Idaho, U.S.
- Area served: Worldwide
- Key people: Sanjay Mehrotra (chairman, president & CEO); April Arnzen (CPO)
- Products: DRAM; Flash memory (NAND and NOR); SSDs; HBM; Memory modules; CXL memory; UFS & eMMC
- Brands: SpecTek; Crucial (discontinued February 2026); Ballistix Gaming (discontinued February 2022)
- Revenue: ▲US$133.2 billion (2026)
- Operating income: ▲US$101.2 billion (2026)
- Net income: ▲US$86.8 billion (2026)
- Total assets: ▲US$195.9 billion (2026)
- Total equity: ▲US$138.4 billion (2026)
- Number of employees: 53,000 (2025)
- Website: micron.com
- Footnotes; Financials as of August 29, 2025.

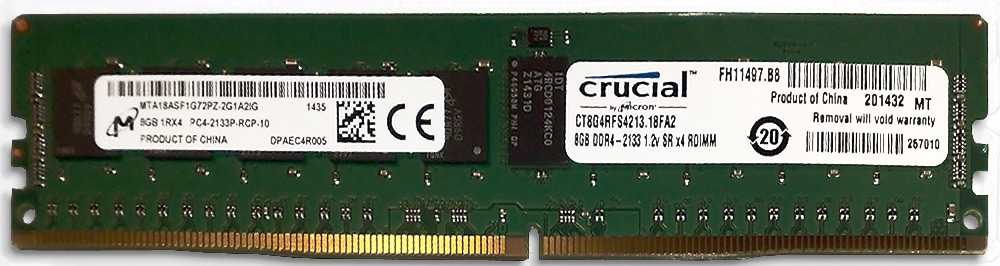
DDR4 RDIMM featuring both Micron logo (far left) and Crucial logo (centre right)

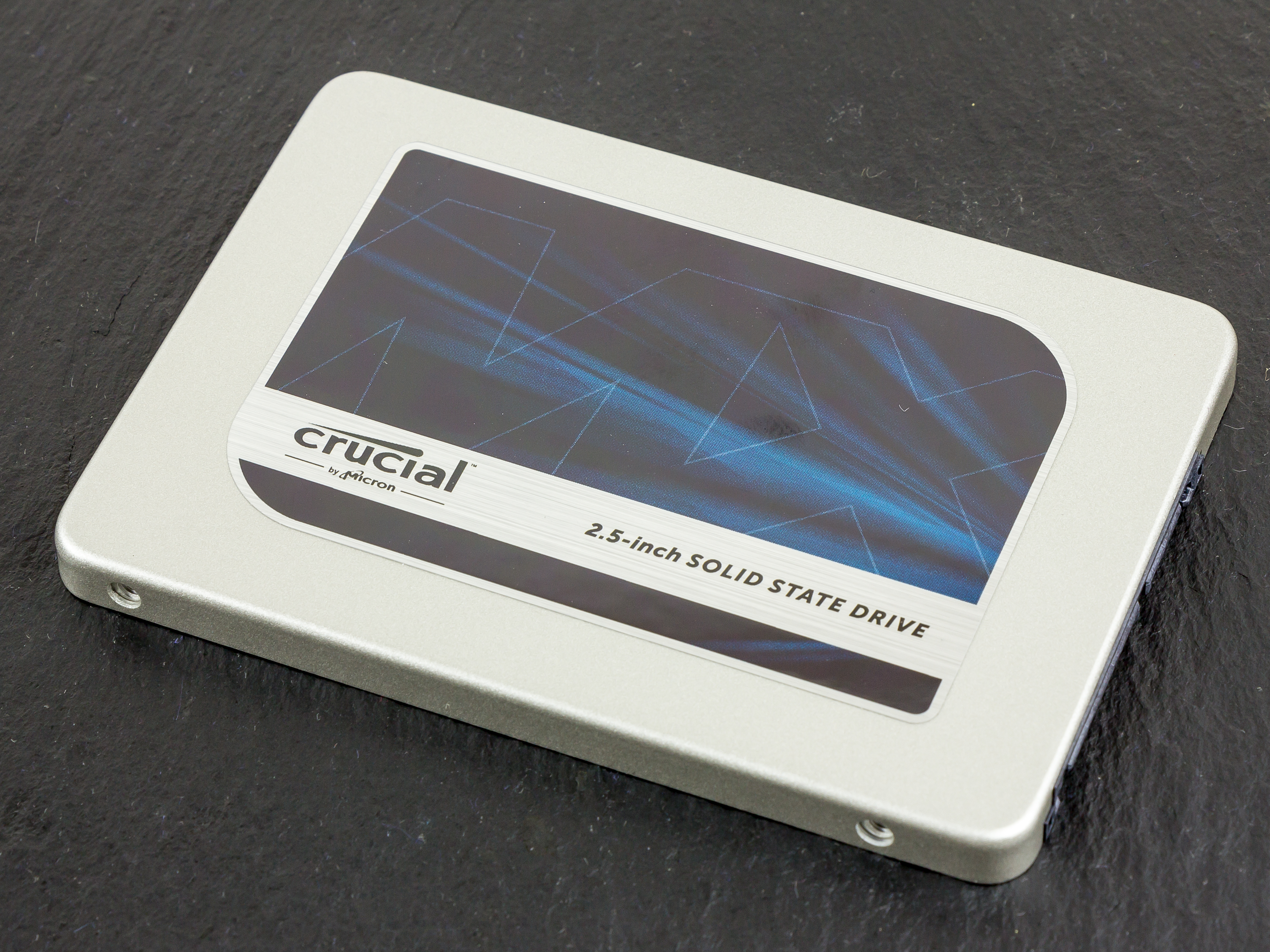
Crucial-branded 525GB solid state drive

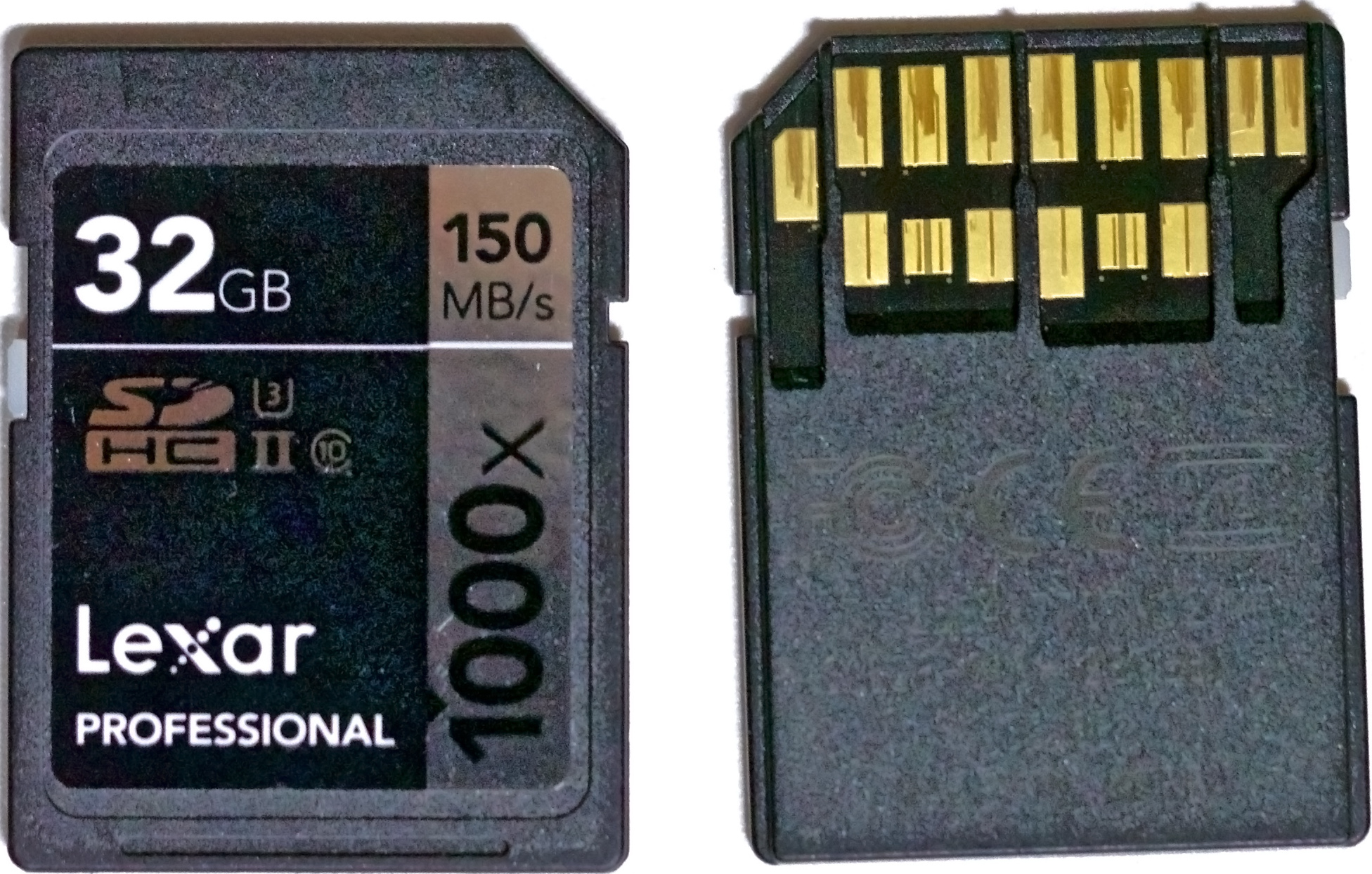
Lexar SDXC UHS-II memory card (front and back) manufactured while the company was owned by Micron

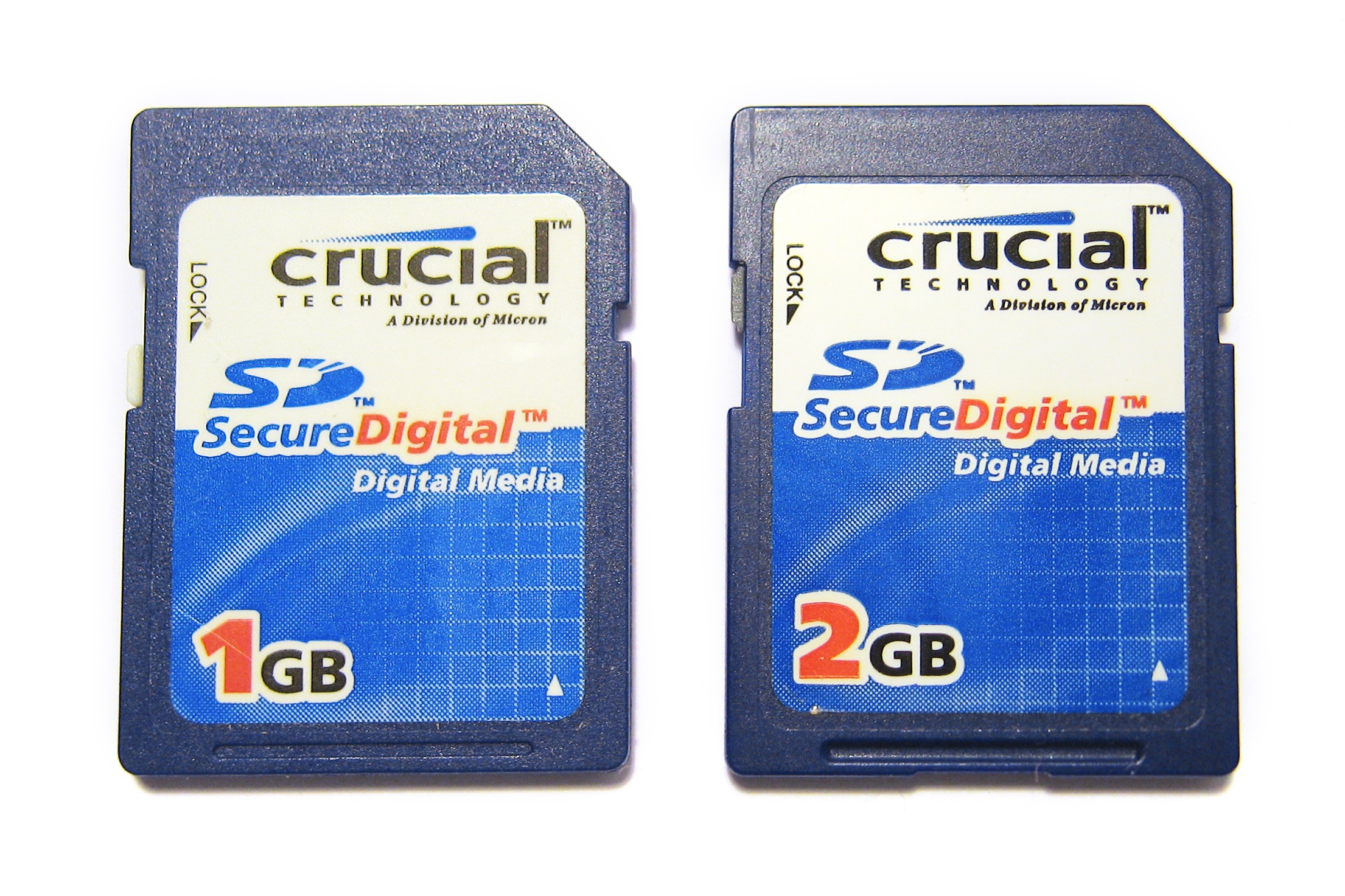
Crucial-branded SD memory cards from 2007

Micron Technology, Inc. is an American multinational semiconductor company that manufactures computer memory and computer data storage products, including dynamic random-access memory (DRAM), flash memory, High Bandwidth Memory (HBM), and solid-state drives (SSDs). Founded in 1978 in Boise, Idaho, Micron is the only major American computer memory manufacturer. It is one of the "Big Three" computer memory manufacturers, along with the South Korean companies Samsung Electronics and SK Hynix.

Micron marketed its consumer products under the brand Crucial, with the sub-brand Ballistix being used to denote products targeting gaming computers, until its disestablishment in 2026. Micron and Intel together created IM Flash Technologies, which produced NAND flash memory. It owned Lexar between 2006 and 2017.

Sanjay Mehrotra has served as president and CEO of Micron since 2017.

On May 26, 2026, Micron became the latest U.S. company to reach a US$1 trillion market capitalization, amid surging demand for its HBM chips.

== History ==
=== 1978–1999 ===
Micron was founded in Boise, Idaho, in 1978 by Ward Parkinson, Joe Parkinson, Dennis Wilson, and Doug Pitman as a semiconductor design consulting company. Startup funding was provided by local Idaho businessmen Tom Nicholson, Allen Noble, Rudolph Nelson, and Ron Yanke. Later it received funding from Idaho billionaire J. R. Simplot, whose fortune was made in the potato business. In 1981, the company moved from consulting to manufacturing with the completion of its first wafer fabrication unit ("Fab 1"), producing 64K DRAM chips.

In 1984, the company had its initial public offering.

Micron sought to enter the market for RISC processors in 1991 with a product known as FRISC, targeting embedded control and signal processing applications. Running at 80 MHz and described as "a 64-bit processor with fast context-switching time and high floating-point performance", the design supported various features for timely interrupt handling and featured an arithmetic unit capable of handling both integer and floating-point calculations with a claimed throughput of 80 MFLOPS for double-precision arithmetic. Micron aimed to provide a "board-level demonstration supercomputer" in configurations with 256 MB or 1 GB of RAM. Having set up a subsidiary and with the product being designed into graphics cards and accelerators, Micron concluded in 1992 that the effort would not deliver the "best bang for the buck", reassigning engineers to other projects and discontinuing the endeavour.

In 1994, founder Joe Parkinson retired as CEO and Steve Appleton took over as Chairman, President, and CEO.

A 1996 3-way merger among ZEOS International, Micron Computer, and Micron Custom Manufacturing Services (MCMS) increased the size and scope of the company; this was followed rapidly with the 1997 acquisition of NetFrame Systems, in a bid to enter the mid-range server industry. Between 1998 and 2000, the company was the main sponsor of the MicronPC Bowl, or MicronPC.com Bowl.

=== Since 2000 ===
In 2000, Gurtej Singh Sandhu and Trung T. Doan at Micron initiated the development of atomic layer deposition high-k films for DRAM memory devices. This helped drive cost-effective implementation of semiconductor memory, starting with 90 nm node DRAM. Pitch double-patterning was also pioneered by Gurtej Singh Sandhu at Micron during the 2000s, leading to the development of 30-nm class NAND flash memory, and it has since been widely adopted by NAND flash and RAM manufacturers worldwide.

In 2002, Micron spun off its personal computer business as MPC Corporation and put it up for sale. The company found the business difficult as the number 12 American computer maker with only 1.3 percent of the market.

Micron and Intel created a joint venture in 2005, based in IM Flash Technologies in Lehi, Utah. The two companies formed another joint venture in 2011, IM Flash Singapore, in Singapore. In 2012 Micron became sole owner of this second joint venture. In 2006 Micron acquired Lexar, an American manufacturer of digital media products.

The company changed leadership again in June 2007 with COO Mark Durcan becoming president. In 2008, Micron converted the Avezzano chip fab, formerly a Texas Instruments DRAM fab, into a production facility for CMOS image sensors sold by Aptina Imaging.

In 2008, Micron spun off Aptina Imaging, which was acquired by ON Semiconductor in 2014. Micron retained a stake in the spinoff. However, the core company suffered setbacks and had to lay off 15 percent of its workforce in October 2008, during which period the company also announced the purchase of Qimonda's 35.6 percent stake in Inotera Memories for $400 million. The trend of layoffs and acquisitions continued in 2009 with the termination of an additional 2,000 employees, and the acquisition of the FLCOS microdisplay company Displaytech. Micron agreed to buy flash-chip maker Numonyx for $1.27 billion in stock in February 2010.

On February 3, 2012, CEO Appleton died in a plane crash shortly after takeoff from the Boise Airport. He was the pilot and sole occupant of the Lancair IV aircraft. Mark Durcan replaced Appleton as the CEO shortly thereafter, eliminating his former title of president.

In 2013, the Avezzano chip fab was sold to LFoundry. In the 2012 to 2014 period, Micron again went through an acquisition-layoff cycle, becoming the majority shareholder of Inotera Memories, purchasing Elpida Memory for $2 billion and the remaining shares in Rexchip, a PC memory chip manufacturing venture between Powerchip and Elpida Memory for $334 million, while announcing plans to lay off approximately 3,000 workers. Through the Elpida acquisition, Micron became a major supplier to Apple Inc. for the iPhone and iPad. In December 2016 Micron finished acquiring the remaining 67 percent of Inotera, making it a 100 percent subsidiary of Micron.

In April 2017, Micron announced Sanjay Mehrotra as the new president and CEO to replace Mark Durcan. In June 2017 Micron announced it was discontinuing the Lexar retail removable media storage business and putting some or all of it up for sale. In August of that year the Lexar brand was acquired by Longsys, a flash memory company based in Shenzhen, China.

In May 2018, Micron Technology and Intel launched QLC NAND memory to increase storage density. The company ranked 150th on the Fortune 500 list of largest United States corporations by revenue.

In February 2019, the first microSD card with a storage capacity of 1 terabyte (TB) was announced by Micron. As of March 2020 3.84TB Micron 5210 Ion is the cheapest large-capacity SSD in the world. In September 2020 the company introduced the world's fastest discrete graphics memory solution. Working with computing technology leader Nvidia, Micron debuted GDDR6X in the Nvidia GeForce RTX 3090 and GeForce RTX 3080 graphics processing units (GPUs). In November 2020, the company unveiled a new 176-layer 3D NAND module. It offers improved read and write latency and is slated to be used in the production of a new generation of solid-state drives.

On October 22, 2021, Micron closed the sale of IM Flash's Lehi, Utah fab to Texas Instruments for a sale price of US$900 million. In February 2022, Micron announced that it would discontinue its Ballistix gaming brand. With the passage of the CHIPS and Science Act, Micron announced its pledge to invest billions in new manufacturing within the United States. In September 2022, Micron announced it would invest $15 billion in a new facility in Boise, Idaho. In October 2022, Micron announced a $100 billion expansion in Clay, New York.

Micron Technology owed Netlist, Inc. $445 million in damages for infringing Netlist's patents related to memory-module technology for high-performance computing. The jury found that Micron's semiconductor-memory products violated two of Netlist's patents willfully, potentially allowing the judge to triple the damages. Netlist had sued Micron in 2022, accusing three of its memory-module lines of patent infringement, which Micron denied, also arguing the patents' invalidity. The U.S. Patent and Trademark Office invalidated one patent in April 2024.

On June 30, 2026, Micron announced they would be investing $250 million in Trump Accounts, which include employee contribution matching and seed funding for eligible children in local communities.

In July 2026, Micron increased its planned United States investment to more than US$250 billion through 2035. The expanded programme included US$3 billion for the domestic semiconductor supply chain, of which US$500 million was allocated to support GlobalWafers' 300 mm silicon-wafer manufacturing facility in Sherman, Texas. Micron and GlobalWafers also agreed to a ten-year wafer-supply arrangement.

=== Crucial brand disestablishment (2025–2026) ===
In December 2025, Micron announced it will discontinue the Crucial brand and exit the consumer market in February 2026 and focus on enterprise markets including data centers and artificial intelligence.

On January 27, 2026, Micron Technology committed approximately $24 billion to expand its wafer manufacturing operations in Singapore, adding 700,000 square feet of cleanroom space at an existing NAND manufacturing complex.

As of 2026, Micron is making significant investments in chip-making facilities in the United States, including $200 billion in total commitment. The company is expanding its Boise campus to 900 acres, including the construction of two new chip-making factories.

=== Lawsuits ===
==== Fujian Jinhua ====
On December 5, 2017 Micron sued rivals United Microelectronics Corporation and Fujian Jinhua Integrated Circuit Co. (JHICC) in the United States District Court for the Northern District of California, alleging infringement on its DRAM patents and intellectual property rights. The U.S. Justice Department in 2018 announced an indictment against Fujian Jinhua, and authorities added the Chinese firm to the Entity List the same year. Fujian Jinhua vehemently denied the claims, saying it had not stolen any technology, and that "Micron regards the development of Fujian Jinhua as a threat and adopts various means to hamper and destroy the development of Fujian Jinhua."

In May 2023, the Cyberspace Administration of China barred major Chinese information infrastructure firms from purchasing Micron products, citing significant national security risks. The move was seen as retaliation against US sanctions on China's semiconductor industry and related export controls. In November 2023 Chinese chipmaker Yangtze Memory Technologies Corp (YMTC) filed a lawsuit against Micron alleging infringement of eight of its patents.

On February 27, 2024, Judge Maxine Chesney of the U.S. Federal District Court in San Francisco acquitted Fujian Jinhua Integrated Circuit, whom Micron had sued for IP theft, of the charge in a non-jury verdict, believing that there was insufficient evidence to support the charge.

== Corporate affairs ==
=== Executive leadership ===
The executive leadership team includes.

- Sanjay Mehrotra (President and Chief Executive Officer)
- April Arnzen (Executive Vice President and Chief People Officer)
- Manish Bhatia (Executive Vice President, Global Operations)
- Scott J. DeBoer (Executive Vice President, Technology and Products)
- Mark Murphy (Executive Vice President and Chief Financial Officer)
- Sumit Sadana (Executive Vice President and Chief Business Officer)
- Mike Cordano (Senior Vice President, Worldwide Sales)
- Michael Ray (Senior Vice President, Chief Legal Officer and Corporate Secretary)

=== Subsidiaries ===
Micron owns multiple entities around the globe.

- Micron Europe Limited
- Micron Japan, Ltd.
- Micron Semiconductor Asia Pte. Ltd.
- Micron Semiconductor (Deutschland) GmbH
- Micron Semiconductor France, SAS
- Micron Semiconductor Korea Co., Ltd.
- Micron Semiconductor Products, Inc.
- Micron Semiconductor (Xiamen) Co., Ltd.
- Micron Technology Services, Inc.
- Micron Technology Asia Pacific, Inc.
- Micron Technology Italia S.r.l.
- Micron Technology Puerto Rico, Inc.
- Micron Technology Services, Inc.
- Micron Technology Texas, LLC

=== Financial ===
As of February 2026, Micron had a market cap of $463.33 billion, making it one of the 100 most valuable companies in the world.

Year	Annual revenue (millions)	Annual profit (millions)
2026	$133,188	$84,969
2025	$37,378	$8,539
2024	$25,111	$778
2023	$15,540	($5,833)
2022	$30,758	$8,687
2021	$27,435	$5,861
2020	$21,435	$2,687
2019	$23,406	$6,313
2018	$30,391	$14,135
2017	$20,322	$5,089
2016	$12,399	($276)
2015	$16,192	$2,899
2014	$16,358	$3,045
2013	$9,073	$1,190
2012	$8,234	($1,032)
2011	$8,788	$167
2010	$8,482	$1,850
2009	$4,803	($1,882)

=== Ownership ===
Micron is mainly owned by institutional investors, who hold around 80% of all shares. The five largest shareholders in early 2026 were:

- Vanguard Group (9.3%)
- BlackRock (8.34%)
- Capital World Investors (5.7%)
- State Street Corporation (4.59%)
- Fidelity Investments (3.56%)

== See also ==
- List of companies based in Idaho
- List of semiconductor fabrication plants
