= Greg Patton =

American tennis coach

Current position
- Conference: Mountain West Conference
- Record: 0-0

Biographical details
- Born: September 1, 1952 (age 74)

Coaching career (HC unless noted)
- 2003-current: BSU
- 2003-2009: WTT:St. Louis Aces
- 1998-2003: USA National Team
- 1992-1998: BSU
- 1979-1992: UC Irvine
- 1976-1978: UC-Santa Barbara

Head coaching record
- Overall: 759-343 (2004?)

Accomplishments and honors

Championships
- 2003 WAC Championship; 2002 World Junior Cup Championship

Awards
- (Awards the coach has received)

Records
- (coaching records; e.g. all-time wins, etc.)

Greg Patton (born 1952) is a tennis coach, both nationally and at a collegiate level. He currently leads the nationally ranked Boise State Broncos of men's tennis program of Boise State University as their head coach. His career record at Boise State is 203-67. At Boise State, he has won seven conference championships in nine seasons in four different conferences (Big Sky, Big West, Western Athletic Conference, Mountain West).

His overall college coaching record is 554-260.

Patton is also a veteran coach in the World TeamTennis ranks. He was the head coach of the St. Louis Aces, whose roster includes Andy Roddick.

He lives in Boise, Idaho with his wife, Christa, an adjunct French Professor at Boise State, and two children, Chelsea and Garrett. Garrett is currently playing professionally in Europe.

== Playing career ==
Greg Patton played his collegiate tennis for the UC Santa Barbara Gauchos of the University of California, Santa Barbara in 1972-73 and 1973-74.

== Coaching career ==
Patton began his coaching career at his alma mater, UC Santa Barbara, where he coached in 1976-77 and 1977-78. He also coached at CSU Bakersfield for one season (1978–79) before beginning his 13-year stint at UC Irvine.

=== National coach ===
From 1984 through 1987 he served as the Head Junior National Coach with the USA Junior National Team that included Pete Sampras, Jim Courier, Michael Chang, Patrick McEnroe, Luke Jensen, David Wheaton and MaliVai Washington.

Locally and nationally, Patton is popularly credited with putting Boise State on the American collegiate tennis map. Boise State had not won a conference tennis title since 1974 when he first joined the Broncos. Coach Patton changed things quickly – winning Big Sky trophies in 1993, 1994, 1995, and 1996. He then led the Broncos to their fifth consecutive league title in 1997, which was a Big West trophy. That same season, Boise State was ranked as high as second in the nation, went to the Sweet 16 in the NCAA Tournament, and finished fifth.

He moved full-time to U.S. national team coaching duties when he first left Boise State in 1998, coaching primarily at the junior level. In the winter of 2002-03, he led the National boys 14's team to a World Junior Cup Championship, beating teams from Spain and Argentina to take the title. He has coached several junior players to finish in the top five in the world rankings. Before coaching for U.S.A. Tennis on a full-time basis, Patton had coached with junior national teams for several years.

=== Back to Boise ===
Patton returned for a second Boise State tour in March 2003 and marked that comeback with a bang that led to a trophy – the 2003 Western Athletic Conference Championship. Patton took over a team that was 5-5 and led the Broncos to a 13-3 run and three consecutive upsets (over Tulsa, Rice, and SMU) to win the WAC Championship and then a first-round NCAA Tournament upset over Arizona before being stopped in the round of 32 by California. The Broncos celebrated the season with a final ranking of 34th, one region honoree (senior Marcus Berntson), and two All-WAC honorees (Berntson and junior Guillaume Bouvier).

In his 28 years of collegiate coaching, Coach Patton has led his teams to 17 Conference Titles. In his second season back at Boise State (2003–2004), Coach Patton led the Broncos to a 24-8 record, and third place finish in the WAC, and a National ranking that hovered between 30 and 45th in the nation. The final ranking was 45th. Boise State was ranked #1 in the Mountain Region and qualified as the regional representative in the National Team Indoor Championships. Senior Guillaume Bouvier earned a Singles All-American Honor by reaching the round of 16 at the NCAA Championships. This past season (2004–2005), the Broncos under Coach Patton's leadership won the WAC Conference for the second time in the past three years and earned a berth to the NCAA National Team Championships where they defeated North Carolina before losing to Texas A&M. The final national ranking for the Broncos was 31st in the nation with a 31-8 record. Freshman Luke Shields was named an All-American in singles and doubles. Partner Thomas Schoeck earned All-American Honors in doubles. They finished the season ranked 8th in the nation. Luke was named Freshman of the Year by the Mountain Region (Region VII). Team Captain, Beck Roghaar was honored with the Regional Arthur Ashe Sportsmanship/Leadership Award.

- 2003 BSU Men's Head Coach (Mid Season) - As of the 2003 season, he has won seven league titles in three different conferences in eight seasons.
- Coached Boy's 14's National Team to World Championships in Prostejvo, Czech Republic

(first time that USA has won this international team event) August, 2002

- USA National Tennis Coach (USTA High Performance Tennis)
- Boise State Men's Tennis Coach 1993-1998 (record 135-48)

Led Boise State to top 20 National Rankings during these six years and as high as #2 in Division I
Won Big Sky and Big West conference Titles (5 out of 6 seasons)

- World TeamTennis Coach (1990-1993 > Newport Beach Dukes), (1994-1997 > Idaho Sneakers)

Reached Championships of World Team Tennis in Three Seasons.

- USA Pan American Coach in 1991 (Games held in Havana, Cuba) USA won 3 gold medals and one silver out of four events played.
- UC Irvine Men's Tennis Coach 1980-1992 (record 288-150)

Led UC Irvine to top 20 National Ranking in 10 out of 13 Seasons and as high #2 in Division I
Won Big West Conference Title 9 out of 13 Seasons
Named Big West Conference Coach of the Year - 1981, 1983, 1985, 1987, 1988 (Five Awards)

- USA Junior National Coach 1984-1987 (Junior Davis Cup)
- Overall Collegiate Coaching Record (1977–1998) 486-241

Including UC Santa Barbara (1977–1978) and Cal State Bakersfield (1979)

=== World TeamTennis ===
Patton is currently the head coach of the WTT St. Louis Aces. He also coached the Idaho Sneakers from 1994 through 1997 and the Newport Beach Dukes from 1990 through 1993. He was named the WTT Coach of the Year in 1993 and 1995. Three of Coach Patton’s World TeamTennis Teams reached the Championship Match. Players who have played for Coach Patton in World TeamTennis have been Robby Ginepri, Sargis Sargisian, Ricky Leach, Amy Frazier, Zina Garrison, Andy Ram, Jonathon Erlich, as well as Andy Roddick. He has served on numerous NCAA and ITA Committees and is currently a member of the ITA Division I Tennis Operating Committee, representing the Mountain Region.

- WTT season: 13th, 5th with the Aces

2008 Coach of World TeamTennis team the St. Louis Aces.

=== Davis Cup ===
Greg has also been credited with bringing the Davis Cup to Boise.

== Awards and honors ==
Before moving to Idaho in the fall of 1992, Greg coached at UC Irvine from 1979 through 1992. With the Anteaters, Patton led his teams to nine Big West championships and 10 top-25 final national rankings. He was named NCAA Coach of the Year in 1987 and was a five-time Big West Coach of the Year with the Anteaters.

Greg Patton was named Big Sky Coach of the Year in 1993, 1994, 1995, and 1996. 1997 was a big year for Greg, being named Big West Coach of the Year, awarded the USTA/NCAA National Community Service Award, and named the NCAA National Men's Coach of the Year in 1997. Coach Patton was again awarded the USTA/NCAA National Community Service Award in 2003. Thus Coach Patton has accomplished an unprecedented accomplishment by being awarded the National Collegiate Coach of the Year twice (in 1987 and then in 1997) as well as being named the National Community Service Award twice (in 1997 and 2003). In the first seven years he coached at Boise State, the Broncos were ranked in the top 35 in the final national rankings three times (1997, 1996, and 1995). He was inducted into the UC Irvine Athletic Hall of Fame in 2000. In 2004 Coach Patton was named the Mountain Region Coach of the Year. This past season, Coach Patton was named the 2005 WAC Coach of the Year.

- NCAA National Coach of the Year 1987 (UC Irvine)
- 5 time Big West Coach of the Year (UC Irvine)
- World Team Tennis Coach of the Year - 1993 (Newport Beach) 1995 (Idaho)
- Named Conference Coach of the Year 1993-1997 (5 Conference Coach of the Year Awards)
- NCAA National Coach of the Year 1997 (Boise State University)

(Only Coach in NCAA to win the Division I National Collegiate Coach of the Year Honor at two different Universities)

- National USTA/NCAA Community Award (1997)
- UC Irvine Athletic Hall of Fame (Inducted in February, 2000)
- Boise State University Hall of Fame (Inducted in November, 2001)
- Greg Patton was named 2006 WAC Coach of the Year

== Coached players ==
- Anna Kournikova

== Motivational speaker ==
Patton is also a motivational speaker.

=== Other biographies ===
- US Professional Teaching Association
- Bronco Sports:Greg Patton Bio
- Big Bear Sports Ranch - Greg Patton Bio
- World TeamTennis:Greg Patton Bio
- Tennis Spheres - Greg Patton Bio

=== News events ===
- Steve Appleton took BSU's tennis team by storm when he arrived in 1978. Greg Patton, then coach at the University of California, Irvine, heard about Appleton's tennis talent during his junior year of college. Appleton's teammates also realized that this new recruit was exceptional.
- Josh D Weiss Photography
- The Intercollegiate Tennis Association named Greg Patton of Boise State and Sheila McInerney of Arizona State as winners of its 1997 Wilson/ITA Coach of the Year Award for Division I men's and women's programs.
- Former member of the Idaho Sneakers. Coached by Greg Patton and played alongside teammates, Manon Bollegraf, Jon Leach, and Jane Chi. Chi has one career win over Frazier, in Memphis.
