= Manon Bollegraf =

Dutch tennis player

- Full name: Manon Bollegraf
- Country (sports): Netherlands
- Born: 10 April 1964 (age 61) 's-Hertogenbosch, Netherlands
- Height: 1.73 m (5 ft 8 in)
- Turned pro: 1985
- Retired: 2000
- Plays: Right-handed
- Prize money: $2,112,117

Singles
- Career record: 161–151
- Career titles: 1 WTA, 2 ITF
- Highest ranking: No. 29 (9 July 1990)

Grand Slam singles results
- Australian Open: 3R (1989)
- French Open: QF (1992)
- Wimbledon: 3R (1991)
- US Open: 2R (1988–90, 1995)

Doubles
- Career record: 495–247
- Career titles: 26 WTA, 4 ITF
- Highest ranking: No. 4 (16 February 1998)

Grand Slam doubles results
- Australian Open: SF (1995, 1996)
- French Open: QF (1992–93, 1996–97)
- Wimbledon: F (1997)
- US Open: SF (1997)

Mixed doubles
- Career titles: 4

Grand Slam mixed doubles results
- Australian Open: W (1997)
- French Open: W (1989)
- Wimbledon: F (1993)
- US Open: W (1991, 1997)

Manon Maria Bollegraf (born 10 April 1964) is a former professional tennis player from the Netherlands, who was a quarterfinalist at the singles event of the 1992 French Open, a finalist in doubles at the 1997 Wimbledon Championships, and a four-time mixed doubles Grand Slam champion. She also finished fourth in women's doubles at the 1996 Summer Olympics in Atlanta.

== Career ==
Bollegraf reached her highest ranking on the WTA Tour on 9 July 1990, when she became world No. 29. She won 26 doubles tournaments in her career and her highest WTA doubles ranking was No. 4, achieved on 16 February 1998.

She was a member of the Dutch team that reached the Fed Cup final 1997, losing to France.

Bollegraf won four Grand Slam mixed-doubles titles, the 1989 French Open and the 1991 US Open, both teaming up with Tom Nijssen. Partnering Rick Leach, she won the Australian Open and US Open mixed doubles titles in 1997.

Bollegraf was a member of the Idaho Sneakers Team Tennis with Amy Frazier and Jon Leach; coached by Greg Patton (Boise State University men's tennis coach).

== Grand Slam finals ==
=== Women's doubles: 1 (runner-up) ===
Result	Year	Championship	Surface	Partner	Opponents	Score
Loss	1997	Wimbledon	Grass	(United States) Nicole Arendt	(United States) Gigi Fernández (Belarus) Natasha Zvereva	6–7^{(4–7)}, 4–6

=== Mixed doubles: 6 (4 titles, 2 runner-ups) ===
Result	Year	Championship	Surface	Partner	Opponents	Score
Win	1989	French Open	Clay	(Netherlands) Tom Nijssen	(Argentina) Horacio de la Peña (Spain) Arantxa Sánchez Vicario	6–3, 6–7^{(3–7)}, 6–2
Win	1991	US Open	Hard	(Netherlands) Tom Nijssen	(Spain) Emilio Sánchez (Spain) Arantxa Sánchez Vicario	6–2, 7–6^{(7–2)}
Loss	1993	Wimbledon	Grass	(Netherlands) Tom Nijssen	(Australia) Mark Woodforde (United States) Martina Navratilova	3–6, 4–6
Loss	1996	US Open	Hard	(United States) Rick Leach	(United States) Patrick Galbraith (United States) Lisa Raymond	6–7^{(6–8)}, 6–7^{(4–7)}
Win	1997	Australian Open	Hard	(United States) Rick Leach	(South Africa) John-Laffnie de Jager (Latvia) Larisa Neiland	6–3, 6–7^{(5–7)}, 7–5
Win	1997	US Open	Hard	(United States) Rick Leach	(Argentina) Pablo Albano (Argentina) Mercedes Paz	3–6, 7–5, 7–6^{(7–3)}

== Olympic finals ==
=== Doubles (0–1) ===
Outcome	Year	Location	Surface	Partner	Opponents	Score
4th place	1996	Atlanta	Hard	(Netherlands) Brenda Schultz-McCarthy	(Spain) Conchita Martínez (Spain) Arantxa Sánchez	1–6, 3–6

== WTA career finals ==
=== Singles: 3 (1 title, 2 runner-ups) ===
Legend
Grand Slam tournaments (0–0)
Virginia Slims (0–0)
Tier I (0–0)
Tier II (0–0)
Tier III (0–0)
Tier IV & V (1–2)

Result	W/L	Date	Tournament	Surface	Opponent	Score
Win	1–0	Mar 1989	Oklahoma City	Hard (i)	(Soviet Union) Leila Meskhi	6–4, 6–4
Loss	1–1	Feb 1990	Oklahoma City	Hard (i)	(United States) Amy Frazier	4–6, 3–6
Loss	1–2	Feb 1991	Aurora	Carpet	(United States) Lori McNeil	3–6, 4–6

=== Doubles: 55 (26 titles, 29 runner-ups) ===
Legend
Grand Slam tournaments (0–1)
WTA Championships (0–1)
Tier I (5–4)
Tier II (7–12)
Tier III (5–3)
Tier IV & V (7–5)
Virginia Slims (2–3)

Result	W/L	Date	Tournament	Surface	Partner	Opponents	Score
Loss	0–1	Dec 1986	Buenos Aires	Clay	(Netherlands) Nicole Muns-Jagerman	(United States) Lori McNeil (Argentina) Mercedes Paz	1–6, 6–2, 1–6
Win	1–1	May 1988	Strasbourg	Clay	(Australia) Nicole Bradtke	(Australia) Jenny Byrne (Australia) Janine Thompson	7–5, 6–7^{(11–13)}, 6–3
Win	2–1	Feb 1989	Wichita	Hard (i)	(South Africa) Lise Gregory	(United States) Sandy Collins (Soviet Union) Leila Meskhi	6–2, 7–6^{(7–5)}
Loss	2–2	May 1989	Rome	Clay	(Argentina) Mercedes Paz	(Australia) Liz Smylie (Australia) Janine Thompson	4–6, 3–6
Win	3–2	Jul 1989	Brussels	Clay	(Argentina) Mercedes Paz	(Netherlands) Carin Bakkum (Netherlands) Simone Schilder	6–1, 6–2
Win	4–2	Oct 1989	Bayonne	Hard (i)	(France) Catherine Tanvier	(South Africa) Elna Reinach (Italy) Raffaella Reggi	7–6^{(7–3)}, 7–5
Win	5–2	Nov 1989	Nashville	Hard (i)	(United States) Meredith McGrath	(Soviet Union) Natalia Medvedeva (Soviet Union) Leila Meskhi	1–6, 7–6^{(7–5)}, 7–6^{(7–4)}
Win	6–2	Feb 1990	Wichita	Hard (i)	(United States) Meredith McGrath	(United States) Mary-Lou Daniels (United States) Wendy White	6–0, 6–2
Loss	6–3	Feb 1990	Oklahoma City	Hard (i)	(South Africa) Lise Gregory	(United States) Mary-Lou Daniels (United States) Wendy White	5–7, 2–6
Loss	6–4	Sep 1990	Doubles Championships	Carpet	(United States) Meredith McGrath	(Soviet Union) Larisa Neiland (Soviet Union) Natalia Zvereva	4–6, 1–6
Loss	6–5	Sep 1990	Leipzig	Carpet	(United Kingdom) Jo Durie	(South Africa) Lise Gregory (United States) Gretchen Magers	2–6, 6–4, 3–6
Win	7–5	Oct 1990	Zürich	Carpet	(West Germany) Eva Pfaff	(France) Catherine Suire (South Africa) Dianne Van Rensburg	7–5, 6–4
Loss	7–6	May 1991	Strasbourg	Clay	(Argentina) Mercedes Paz	(United States) Lori McNeil (United States) Stephanie Rehe	7–6^{(7–2)}, 4–6, 4–6
Win	8–6	Oct 1991	Leipzig	Carpet	(France) Isabelle Demongeot	(Canada) Jill Hetherington (United States) Kathy Rinaldi-Stunkel	6–4, 6–3
Loss	8–7	Jan 1992	Brisbane	Hard	(Australia) Nicole Bradtke	(Czechoslovakia) Jana Novotná (Latvia) Larisa Neiland	4–6, 3–6
Loss	8–8	Feb 1992	Oklahoma City	Hard (i)	(United States) Katrina Adams	(United States) Lori McNeil (Australia) Nicole Bradtke	6–3, 4–6, 6–7^{(6–8)}
Loss	8–9	May 1992	Hamburg	Clay	(Spain) Arantxa Sánchez Vicario	(Germany) Steffi Graf (Australia) Rennae Stubbs	6–4, 3–6, 4–6
Win	9–9	May 1992	Waregem	Clay	(Netherlands) Caroline Vis	(Ukraine) Elena Brioukhovets (Czechoslovakia) Petra Langrová	6–4, 6–3
Loss	9–10	Feb 1993	Oklahoma City	Hard (i)	(United States) Katrina Adams	(United States) Patty Fendick (United States) Zina Garrison	3–6, 2–6
Win	10–10	Mar 1993	Houston	Clay	(United States) Katrina Adams	(Russia) Eugenia Maniokova (Slovakia) Radomira Zrubáková	6–3, 5–7, 7–6^{(9–7)}
Loss	10–11	Apr 1993	Hilton Head	Clay	(United States) Katrina Adams	(United States) Gigi Fernández (Belarus) Natalia Zvereva	3–6, 1–6
Win	11–11	Nov 1993	Quebec City	Hard (i)	(United States) Katrina Adams	(Bulgaria) Katerina Maleeva (France) Nathalie Tauziat	6–4, 6–4
Win	12–11	Nov 1993	Philadelphia	Carpet	(United States) Katrina Adams	(Spain) Conchita Martínez (Latvia) Larisa Neiland	6–2, 4–6, 7–6^{(9–7)}
Loss	12–12	Jan 1994	Tokyo	Carpet	(United States) Martina Navratilova	(United States) Pam Shriver (Australia) Elizabeth Smylie	3–6, 6–3, 6–7^{(3–7)}
Loss	12–13	Feb 1994	Chicago	Carpet	(United States) Martina Navratilova	(United States) Gigi Fernández (Belarus) Natalia Zvereva	3–6, 6–3, 4–6
Loss	12–14	Feb 1994	Oklahoma City	Hard (i)	(United States) Katrina Adams	(United States) Patty Fendick (United States) Meredith McGrath	6–7^{(3–7)}, 2–6
Loss	12–15	Feb 1994	Indian Wells	Hard	(Czech Republic) Helena Suková	(United States) Lindsay Davenport (United States) Lisa Raymond	2–6, 4–6
Loss	12–16	Mar 1994	Delray Beach	Hard	(Czech Republic) Helena Suková	(Czech Republic) Jana Novotná (Spain) Arantxa Sánchez Vicario	2–6, 0–6
Win	13–16	Mar 1994	Houston	Clay	(United States) Martina Navratilova	(United States) Katrina Adams (United States) Zina Garrison	6–4, 6–2
Loss	13–17	Oct 1994	Leipzig	Carpet	(Latvia) Larisa Neiland	(United States) Patty Fendick (United States) Meredith McGrath	4–6, 4–6
Win	14–17	Oct 1994	Zürich	Carpet	(United States) Martina Navratilova	(United States) Patty Fendick (United States) Meredith McGrath	7–6^{(7–3)}, 6–1
Loss	14–18	Oct 1994	Filderstadt	Hard (i)	(Latvia) Larisa Neiland	(United States) Gigi Fernández (Belarus) Natalia Zvereva	6–7^{(5–7)}, 4–6
Win	15–18	Oct 1994	Brighton	Carpet	(Latvia) Larisa Neiland	(United States) Mary Joe Fernández (Czech Republic) Jana Novotná	4–6, 6–2, 6–3
Loss	15–19	Jan 1995	Hobart	Hard	(Latvia) Larisa Neiland	(Japan) Kyoko Nagatsuka (Japan) Ai Sugiyama	6–2, 4–6, 2–6
Loss	15–20	Feb 1995	Paris	Carpet	(Australia) Rennae Stubbs	(United States) Meredith McGrath (Latvia) Larisa Neiland	4–6, 1–6
Win	16–20	Apr 1995	Hilton Head	Clay	(United States) Nicole Arendt	(United States) Gigi Fernández (Belarus) Natalia Zvereva	0–6, 6–3, 6–4
Loss	16–21	Apr 1995	Amelia Island	Clay	(United States) Nicole Arendt	(South Africa) Amanda Coetzer (Argentina) Inés Gorrochategui	2–6, 6–3, 2–6
Win	17–21	Apr 1995	Houston	Clay	(United States) Nicole Arendt	(Germany) Wiltrud Probst (Canada) Rene Simpson	6–4, 6–2
Loss	17–22	May 1995	World Doubles Cup	Clay	(Australia) Rennae Stubbs	(United States) Meredith McGrath (Latvia) Larisa Neiland	2–6, 6–7^{(2–7)}
Win	18–22	Jun 1995	Birmingham	Grass	(Australia) Rennae Stubbs	(Australia) Nicole Bradtke (Australia) Kristine Kunce	3–6, 6–4, 6–4
Win	19–22	Oct 1995	Zürich	Carpet	(United States) Nicole Arendt	(United States) Chanda Rubin (Netherlands) Caroline Vis	6–4, 6–7^{(4–7)}, 6–4
Win	20–22	Nov 1995	Quebec City	Hard (i)	(United States) Nicole Arendt	(United States) Lisa Raymond (Australia) Rennae Stubbs	7–6^{(8–6)}, 4–6, 6–2
Win	21–22	Mar 1996	Linz	Carpet	(United States) Meredith McGrath	(Australia) Rennae Stubbs (Czech Republic) Helena Suková	6–4, 6–4
Win	22–22	May 1996	Doubles Championships	Clay	(United States) Nicole Arendt	(United States) Gigi Fernández (Belarus) Natalia Zvereva	6–3, 2–6, 7–6^{(8–6)}
Win	23–22	Feb 1997	Hanover	Carpet	(United States) Nicole Arendt	(Latvia) Larisa Neiland (Netherlands) Brenda Schultz-McCarthy	4–6, 6–3, 7–6^{(7–4)}
Loss	23–23	Apr 1997	Amelia Island	Clay	(United States) Nicole Arendt	(United States) Lindsay Davenport (Czech Republic) Jana Novotná	3–6, 0–6
Win	24–23	May 1997	Rome	Clay	(United States) Nicole Arendt	(Spain) Conchita Martínez (Argentina) Patricia Tarabini	6–2, 6–4
Win	25–23	May 1997	Doubles Championships	Clay	(United States) Nicole Arendt	(Australia) Rachel McQuillan (Japan) Nana Miyagi	6–1, 3–6, 7–5
Loss	25–24	Jul 1997	Wimbledon	Grass	(United States) Nicole Arendt	(United States) Gigi Fernández (Belarus) Natalia Zvereva	6–7^{(4–7)}, 4–6
Loss	25–25	Aug 1997	Rogers Cup Toronto	Hard	(United States) Nicole Arendt	(Indonesia) Yayuk Basuki (Netherlands) Caroline Vis	6–3, 5–7, 4–6
Win	26–25	Aug 1997	Stone Mountain	Hard	(United States) Nicole Arendt	(France) Alexandra Fusai (France) Nathalie Tauziat	6–7^{(7–5)}, 6–3, 6–2
Loss	26–26	Nov 1998	Sparkassen Cup Leipzig	Carpet (i)	(Romania) Irina Spîrlea	(Russia) Elena Likhovtseva (Japan) Ai Sugiyama	3–6, 7–6^{(7–2)}, 1–6
Loss	26–27	Apr 2000	Miami Masters	Hard	(United States) Nicole Arendt	(France) Julie Halard-Decugis (Japan) Ai Sugiyama	6–4, 5–7, 4–6
Loss	26–28	May 2000	Hamburg	Clay	(United States) Nicole Arendt	(Russia) Anna Kournikova (Belarus) Natalia Zvereva	7–6^{(7–5)}, 2–6, 4–6
Loss	26–29	Nov 2000	WTA Championships	Carpet	(United States) Nicole Arendt	(Switzerland) Martina Hingis (Russia) Anna Kournikova	2–6, 3–6

== ITF Circuit finals ==
$50,000 tournaments
$25,000 tournaments
$10,000 tournaments

=== Singles: 3 (2–1) ===
Result	No.	Date	Tournament	Surface	Opponent	Score
Loss	1.	20 January 1986	ITF San Antonio, United States	Hard	(United States) Nicole Arendt	3–6, 3–6
Win	1.	16 June 1986	ITF Birmingham, United States	Clay	(Australia) Susan Leo	6–1, 6–1
Win	2.	23 June 1986	ITF Seabrook, United States	Clay	(United States) Amy Schwartz	6–2, 7–6^{(8–6)}

=== Doubles: 6 (4–2) ===
Result	No.	Date	Tournament	Surface	Partner	Opponents	Score
Win	1.	20 January 1986	ITF San Antonio, United States	Hard	(Netherlands) Marianne van der Torre	(South Africa) Dinky Van Rensburg (United Kingdom) Clare Wood	7–5, 6–7^{(4–7)}, 6–4
Win	2.	16 June 1986	ITF Fayetteville, United States	Hard	(Netherlands) Carin Bakkum	(Netherlands) Digna Ketelaar (Brazil) Themis Zambrzycki	6–3, 7–6^{(7–3)}
Win	3.	23 June 1986	ITF Seabrook, United States	Clay	(South Africa) Lise Gregory	(Australia) Alison Scott (Australia) Michelle Turk	6–2, 6–1
Loss	4.	14 July 1986	ITF Landskrona, Sweden	Clay	(Netherlands) Marianne van der Torre	(Netherlands) Carin Bakkum (Netherlands) Nicole Muns-Jagerman	6–4, 2–6, 2–6
Loss	5.	10 November 1986	ITF São Paulo, Brazil	Hard	(Netherlands) Nicole Muns-Jagerman	(Brazil) Niege Dias (Brazil) Patricia Medrado	w/o
Win	6.	27 January 1992	ITF Midland, United States	Clay	(United States) Meredith McGrath	(Canada) Helen Kelesi (Netherlands) Caroline Vis	6–3, 6–1

== Grand Slam performance timelines ==
Key
W	F	SF	QF	#R	RR	Q#	DNQ	A	NH

(W) winner; (F) finalist; (SF) semifinalist; (QF) quarterfinalist; (#R) rounds 4, 3, 2, 1; (RR) round-robin stage; (Q#) qualification round; (DNQ) did not qualify; (A) absent; (NH) not held; (SR) strike rate (events won / competed); (W–L) win–loss record.

=== Women’s Doubles ===
Tournament	1987	1988	1989	1990	1991	1992	1993	1994	1995	1996	1997	1998	1999	2000	Career W–L
Grand Slam tournaments
Australian Open	1R	QF	2R	1R	QF	QF	3R	QF	SF	SF	QF	QF	QF	A	31–13
French Open	1R	2R	2R	3R	3R	QF	QF	3R	3R	QF	QF	3R	2R	3R	27–14
Wimbledon	2R	3R	3R	1R	QF	3R	1R	SF	3R	3R	F	3R	QF	2R	28–14
US Open	A	1R	2R	3R	QF	A	3R	QF	2R	QF	SF	2R	QF	1R	23–12

=== Mixed doubles ===
Tournament	1988	1989	1990	1991	1992	1993	1994	1995	1996	1997	1998	1999	2000	Career W–L
Grand Slam tournaments
Australian Open	A	SF	A	1R	2R	2R	2R	1R	2R	W	1R	SF	A	15–9
French Open	SF	W	2R	1R	SF	3R	2R	2R	SF	SF	QF	2R	2R	22–12
Wimbledon	1R	3R	3R	2R	SF	F	1R	1R	1R	QF	1R	3R	QF	22–13
US Open	A	SF	QF	W	A	QF	1R	1R	F	W	1R	1R	A	20–8
