= Qimonda =

2006–2011 German computer memory manufacturer

Qimonda AG
- Type: AG
- Industry: Semiconductors
- Founded: 2006
- Defunct: 2011
- Fate: Filed for bankruptcy in multiple jurisdictions
- Headquarters: Munich, Germany
- Key people: Kin Wah Loh; (CEO); Thomas J. Seifert; (CFO, COO)
- Products: DRAM
- Revenue: Euro 1.79 billion net sales (FY 2008)
- Number of employees: Around 13,500 at height (2007). no official figures updated since restructuring Oct 2008
- Website: http://www.qimonda.com

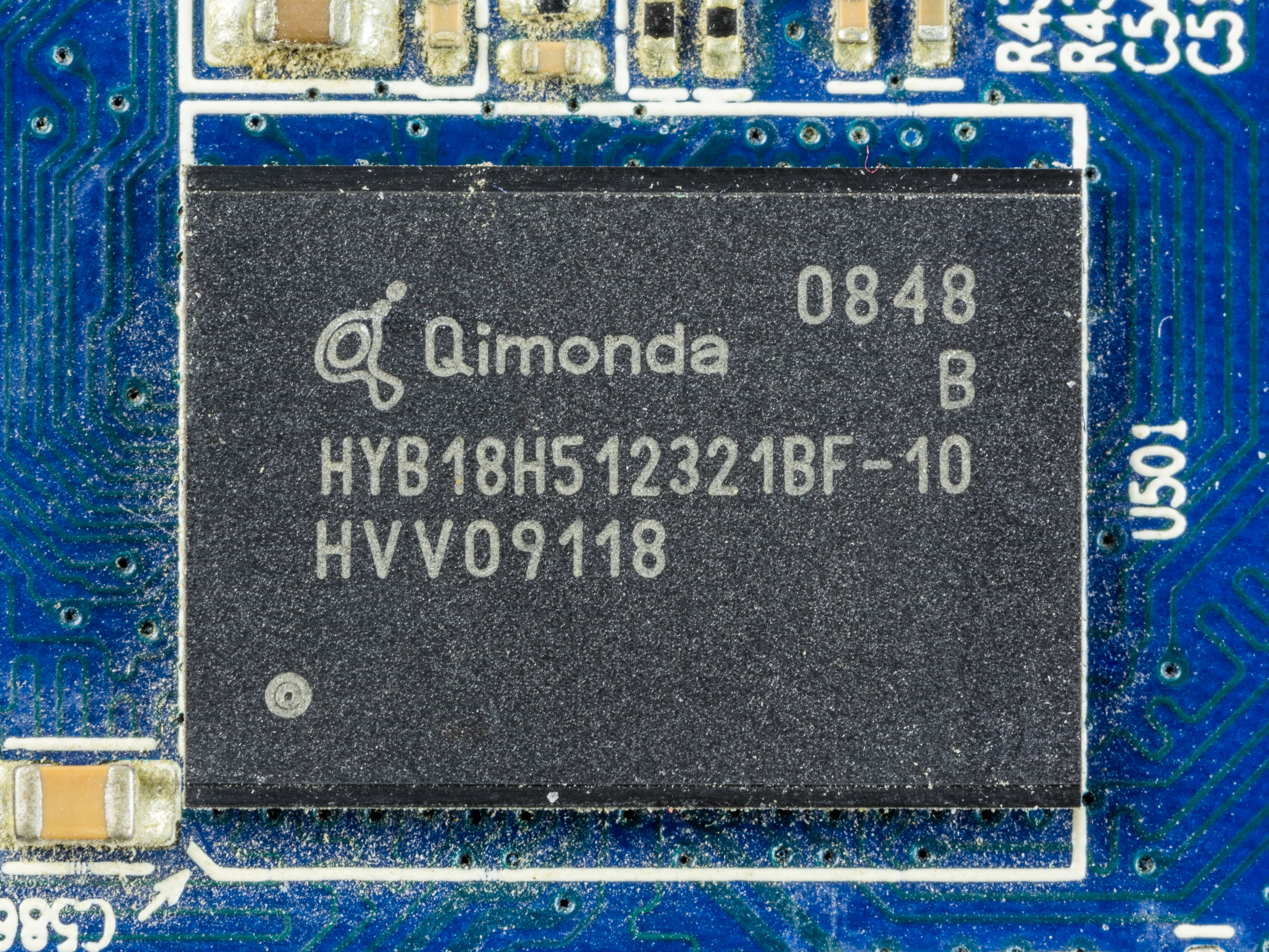
Qimonda 512 Mbit GDDR3

Qimonda AG (/ˌkiˈmoʊndə/ kee-MOHN-də) was a German memory company split out of Infineon Technologies (itself a spun off business unit of Siemens AG) on 1 May 2006 to form at the time the second largest DRAM company worldwide, according to the industry research firm Gartner Dataquest. It was a patent licensing firm until Micron and others purchased its patents. Headquartered in Munich, Qimonda was a 300 mm manufacturer and was one of the top suppliers of DRAM products for the PC and server markets. Infineon still controlled a 77.5% stake in 2008, which it later wrote down. Infineon was on record as having the aim of divesting itself of this stake, with the purpose of becoming a minority stakeholder in 2009. The company issued 42 million ADR shares, each ADR share representing one ordinary share in Qimonda.

At its height in 2007, Qimonda employed approximately 13,500 personnel worldwide, of whom 1,800 were employed in R&D with access to four 300 mm manufacturing sites and operating six major R&D facilities, and included a chip packaging complex in Vila do Conde, Portugal, and its lead R&D center in Dresden, Germany, in total covering three continents. During this time the prices of DRAM continued to decline due to market oversupply, resulting in significant corporate financial losses throughout 2008.

== Meaning of Qimonda ==
"Qimonda" is an invented name, which falls into the "evocative" class by branding agencies. These names are designed to evoke the qualities of the product or company rather than explain the actual goods or services the company supplies. Along with the new name, the company supplies an explanation of its meaning:

The name and brand identity of Qimonda express the philosophy and personality of the company, illustrating its vision and values. The word “Qimonda” carries different meanings and allows associations in different languages. In Chinese, “Qi”, pronounced as "ch-ee', stands for breathing and flowing energy, while “monda” denotes “world” in Latin-based languages. "Qi", when pronounced as a hard "k", suggests “key to the world”, a positive connotation.

== Products and achievements ==
Qimonda produced computing and consumer DRAM, graphics RAM, mobile RAM and Flash memory.

Qimonda was primarily reliant on its Deep Trench technology in comparison to the stack capacitor systems of its rival manufacturers. Deep Trench has the benefit of a theoretically smaller footprint than its stack capacitor rival. With approximately one-third lower power consumption due to lower leakage currents, its advantages lie in mobile and laptop applications where power supply is a limiting factor. Although offering significant advantages, deep trench technology is technically difficult to manufacture and has led to slippage of Qimonda's technology shrink roadmap in comparison to many of its rivals in recent years.

In 2008, Qimonda announced the development of its Buried Wordline Technology. Retaining many of the advantages of Deep Trench technology, in theory it simplifies the manufacturing process and the time provided Qimonda with a competitive technology shrink roadmap. All 200 mm manufacturing ended by January 2009.

On September 18, 2006, Qimonda AG along with Nanya Technology Corporation announced the successful qualification of the 75 nm DRAM trench technology. Process structures of 75 nm further reduce chip size compared to the previous 90 nm technology thereby increasing potential chip output per wafer by about 40 percent.

On November 1, 2007, Qimonda AG announced shipment of first GDDR5 samples.

On February 3, 2009, Qimonda AG announced the first 46 nm working production chips using its Buried Wordline technology, fabricated at its Dresden 300 mm plant.

== Restructuring and decline ==
=== Qimonda AG ===
In October 2008, major restructuring was announced to try to reduce losses and re-align the company within the struggling DRAM sector. The restructuring saw the sale of Qimonda's interest in its largest 300 mm manufacturing site (Inotera, Taiwan - a joint venture between Nanya Technology and Qimonda AG, with QAG owning 35.6% at the time of sale) to its rival Micron Technology for approximately $400m in cash. Additionally, CEO Kin Wah Loh announced the closure by January 2009 of the company's single remaining 200 mm site as well as the adjoining 300 mm facility located in Richmond, Virginia. Other restructuring included the complete closure of the Raleigh R&D facility and the termination of the back-end component and module manufacturing site in Dresden. Altogether, approximately 3000 employees would be made redundant by the changes (excluding the Micron buy-out of Inotera).

With a historical emphasis on PC and server products, the company then focused on products for graphics, mobile and consumer applications using its power-saving deep trench technology.

On October 28, 2008, Qimonda AG achieved the lowest share price of USD 0.19 on NYSE.

On November 24, 2008, Qimonda AG achieved the lowest share price of USD 0.05 on NYSE.

The company continued to lose money, and sought new investors to help keep the company afloat. The continuing fall in the spot price of commodity DRAM resulted in Qimonda’s 75 nm Deep Trench technology no longer being economically viable. The decision was taken in November 2008 to cease production of all commodity DRAM at their Dresden and Richmond 300 mm manufacturing sites. Until this point Richmond had predominantly produced graphics DRAM, whilst Dresden manufactured commodity DRAM. This left the Dresden site’s production capability severely under-utilised (although a significant proportion of the line utilization remained as technology development). All of the graphics manufacture was therefore transferred from Richmond to Dresden.

Qimonda’s financial situation worsened during December and the company focused its efforts on securing additional financial support. On December 21, 2008, Qimonda AG issued a press release stating that they had secured a financial package of €325 million for the ramp up of Buried Wordline technology. The package comprised a €150 million loan from the German state of Saxony, €100 million from an unspecified leading financial institution in Portugal, and €75 million from Infineon, Qimonda’s parent company. In addition, they were provided with the opportunity to draw on €280 million in the form of a state guarantee provided by the German federal government. In return, Qimonda agreed to commit to further development of their R&D and manufacturing sites in Porto, Portugal and Dresden, and to quickly ramp up their 46 nm BWT to improve economies of scale at Dresden.

=== Qimonda North America ===
As a separate legal entity, Qimonda North America (QNA) remained technically solvent. However, without financial support from the parent company or access to revenue from sales (which went to Qimonda AG) there were few options available to QNA.

On September 16, 2008, Qimonda North America announced that no funding would be issued for merit increases or promotions as part of the year-end appraisal process in order to reduce costs.

On October 13, 2008, Qimonda North America announced that it was closing its 200 mm wafer fabrication plant in Richmond, VA, resulting in the loss of 1200 jobs.

On October 27, 2008, Qimonda North America announced that the approved incentive payments due to be paid to employees that month had been postponed until January 16, 2009, for Richmond employees and February 13, 2009, for QNA-direct employees.

Qimonda North America announced mandatory unpaid leave in December, 2008 for all employees at its Richmond site amounting to a 10% salary reduction for exempt staff and approximately 15% reduction for non-exempt employees. The mandatory unpaid leave was expected to last until the beginning of April 2009.

On February 3, 2009, Qimonda North America announced the closure by April of its remaining 300 mm wafer fabrication plant in Richmond, VA. This is the first known closure of an operating 300 mm production fab.

Over the next two months, 1500 employees would be laid off without severance pay. Five hundred employees were made redundant within 24 hours of the announcement. A further 500 were to be made redundant over the coming month. The remainder were to be made redundant as the plant equipment is sold or mothballed by the beginning of April.

== Bankruptcy and Litigation ==
=== Qimonda AG ===
Qimonda AG and Qimonda Dresden OHG filed for insolvency protection on January 23, 2009 (similar to Chapter 11 bankruptcy in U.S. courts), stating that the promised bailout package had not become available in time. They requested the insolvency protection be backdated to January 1, 2009. However, subsequent media reporting of the event suggests that the agreement to the package fell apart at the last minute, and so was not available. It is reported that shortly prior to filing, Qimonda had requested a further €300 million on top of the already-agreed €325 million. The backers then refused to meet the demands.

The company also published its yearly accounts, which had been delayed several times from its normal release date at the end of October 2008. This showed a drop in net sales to €1.79 billion, down from the previous year's filing of €3.61 billion.

The Munich court appointed Dr. Michael Jaffé as administrator. Dr. Jaffé is a lawyer who specialises in insolvency and restructuring. His most famous previous case was his handling of the collapse of the KirchMedia group. In a press release, CEO Kin Wah Loh stated, “German insolvency laws offers [sic] the opportunity to accelerate the restructuring process that has already been started in order to reposition the company back onto a solid base”. Under German law, the operating costs (including salaries) are underwritten by the government for three months. This means that Qimonda had until March 31, 2009 to secure a solution to its current insolvency issues.

In the days after the announcement, general DRAM spot market prices increased by a peak of 26% from their lowest recorded levels in January. However, within a month of the announcement they had returned to their previous level.

The Dresden site plodded ahead with 46 nm Buried Wordline development and produced the first working samples at the beginning of February 2009. It was hoped that the improved technological and cost advantages of the BWL technology would attract new investors or business partners before insolvency cover ends on March 31, 2009.

On March 13, 2009, according to EETimes, Qimonda in Dresden ceased all DRAM production for the time being. "We have not pulled the plug, we just went to standby-mode," a spokesperson explained. The company together with the administrator had been searching for fresh capital, but it was not possible to finalise a deal by the end of March, which was the end of the insolvency period. The 300 mm Dresden plant will be idled until such time as its future has been decided. Without either a partner to purchase Qimonda or an investor to recapitalise Qimonda, Qimonda's existence as an ongoing concern was dubious at best. Michael Jaffe, the insolvency administrator appointed by a German bankruptcy court, announced that Qimonda is closer to liquidation.

By then, Qimonda Richmond was down to a skeleton crew of approximately 60 people, including 10 staff managers. Prior to the layoffs, the level of staff managers was 10 as well.

On March 16, 2009, China's Inspur ended talks to buy Qimonda.

On April 14, 2009, Qimonda laid off 800 employees in Portugal.

=== Qimonda North America ===
On or about Feb 7, 2009, a laid-off Qimonda employee began legal proceedings against Qimonda North America (QNA) for recompense for two months' worth of pay and benefits in a federal class-action lawsuit. The suit alleges that employees were not given their 60-day written notice of termination or 60 days' severance pay required under the federal Worker Adjustment and Retraining Notification Act (dubbed WARN). Qimonda argued that the “faltering company” exemption under WARN applies, which allows the company to fail to give notice where such advance notice may inhibit the company’s ability to find capital or business with which to continue operating. Several class action lawsuits were filed.

On February 18, 2009 (two days before filing for bankruptcy), the Richmond Times-Dispatch posted an article stating that QNA CFO Miriam Martinez sent out notices to previously laid-off employees informing them that Qimonda North America and Qimonda Richmond were now not in a financial position to honor its severance agreements to those affected employees from the (previous) 200 mm line closure announced in October 2008.

Qimonda North America Corp. and Qimonda Richmond LLC filed for Chapter 11 bankruptcy protection on February 20, 2009 in the U.S. Bankruptcy Court in Delaware.

In their filing, the company lists more than $1 billion in assets and liabilities each, and estimated between 10,000–25,000 creditors. The files’ listing of top 30 creditors shows a total of over $54.2 million owed to traders. QNA CFO Miriam Martinez issued a statement announcing that under the conditions of the bankruptcy filing, all those employees made redundant by the company on or before the date of bankruptcy could no longer be paid any credit due without court authority. This meant that QNA employees who had not already been paid severance would no longer receive any salary, unused vacation time or severance owed to them. This affected the majority of the workforce. Employees' due costs under VISA regulations would also receive no compensation.

Those employees remaining with the company from February 20 onwards would only receive pay and benefits from that day forward, up to a maximum of $10,950. Therefore, no payment would be made to those employees for the work performed between February 7 and February 20.

As a result of the bankruptcy filing, due to the unpaid wages, unpaid vacation balances, no severance, the unpaid severance of those who have severance agreements, and no 60 days' notice of a plant closure as required by the WARN Act, former workers at Qimonda LLC and Qimonda NA in Richmond, VA have decided to file a class action lawsuit against Qimonda to try and recover the unpaid wages, unpaid vacation balance, unpaid severance, and to get 60 days pay for a plant closure as required by the WARN act. The workers were paid before unsecured creditors (e.g., vendors), but after secured creditors. All for a small fraction of their previous entitlement. The Delaware Bankruptcy Court judge agreed to approve a $35.3 million WARN settlement in August 2011.

The Richmond site was only capable of manufacturing Qimonda's 75 nm Deep Trench technology chips with the manufacturing equipment available there. The concurrent DRAM pricing did not make this a viable manufacturing prospect given the financial situation due to the graphics chips, which were developed by the Richmond fab, being transferred to Dresden by Qimonda AG prior to shutting down Qimonda LLC. Because Dresden was the core DRAM development site, manufacturing equipment capable of producing their (at the time, developmental) 46 nm Buried Wordline chips, with its reduced manufacturing cost benefits, was already on site. A corporate decision was taken to consolidate losses by closing the Richmond site. The Richmond fab would not be capable of 46 nm BWL manufacture without substantial new equipment investment, requiring money that Qimonda did not have. Qimonda AG, however, moved the 75 nm video DRAM processes, which commanded a price premium over commodity PC DRAM products, from Richmond to Dresden in the months prior to shutting down Richmond. Transferring the graphics chips process away from Richmond made the situation at Qimonda LLC intractable.

On April 2, 2009, Qimonda put the Richmond, VA site for sale.

On June 22, 2009, Qimonda Richmond is filing a petition in bankruptcy court to allow 46 employees to receive a bonus payment totaling $1.24 million. However, as one may recall, Qimonda declared bankruptcy on Feb. 20, 2009 in Federal Court in Delaware. As a result, many employees did not receive their final paycheck, nor did many employees receive cash in lieu of their vacation balance.

On June 25, 2009, the bankruptcy court in Delaware allowed Qimonda Richmond to pay out a $1.24 million bonus to 46 employees as a part of a "shut down" bonus. No mention was made concerning those who hadn't received their vacation pay or a severance or in some cases, their final paycheck.

On July 1, 2009, former Qimonda employees gathered outside of Qimonda Richmond to protest the $1.24 million payout bonus to 46 employees. Virginia State Delegate Joe Morrissey of the 74th district was present at the protest.

In May 2010, the Qimonda signs were permanently removed from the Sandston, Virginia facility.

The Sandston facility was purchased by Quality Technology Services and converted into a massive datacenter.

== Legacy ==
Qimonda's graphics DRAM was used both in the Nintendo Wii game console (Qimonda GDDR3 graphics DRAM) and in Microsoft's Xbox 360.

Since bankruptcy, Qimonda AG i.L. and its U.S. subsidiary Qimonda Licensing LLC are technology licensing companies that focus on marketing Qimonda's IP portfolio.

Micron Technology owns intellectual property from Qimonda, and CXMT licensed that technology from Qimonda before Micron acquired it.

== Alliances ==
Qimonda's strategic alliance with Nanya Technology Corporation (e.g. the joint-venture Inotera) ended shortly before the buy-out by rival chip-maker Micron Technology when Nanya declined the offer of joint development of Qimonda's Buried Wordline technology. Inotera will continue to supply DRAM to Qimonda until approximately mid-2009. Qimonda has other strategic alliances with China-Singapore Suzhou Industrial Park Venture Co., Ltd., SMIC, Winbond Electronics Corporation, IBM, Altis, AMD (for ATI graphics products), Toppan Photomasks, Spansion, and Sandisk.

== Production sites ==
- Dresden, Germany
- Vila do Conde, Portugal. This factory was for some years (up to 2007) the biggest Portuguese exporter.
- Richmond, Virginia, United States. (Ceased operation and was closed on April 1, 2009.)
- Senai, Johore, Malaysia.

== Media ==
- Video of the July 1, 2009 Qimonda Protest
- Pirate Flag over Qimonda
- Ex-Qimonda workers protest bonuses to current workers
- DRAM prices spike after Qimonda bankruptcy
- Qimonda to close Richmond plant, lay off 1,500
- February 2, 2009 - Qimonda future uncertain despite talks-German state
