= Steve Appleton =

American businessman (1960–2012)

- Born: March 31, 1960; California, U.S.
- Died: February 3, 2012 (aged 51); Boise, Idaho, U.S.
- Resting place: Dry Creek Cemetery; Boise, Idaho
- Education: Boise State University
- Known for: CEO of Micron Technology
- Spouse: Dalynn
- Children: 4

Steven R. Appleton (March 31, 1960 – February 3, 2012) was an American business executive, the CEO of Micron Technology, based in Boise, Idaho.

Born and raised in Southern California, Appleton attended Boise State University and played tennis for the Broncos. A lifelong aviation enthusiast, he died when his single-engine plane crashed shortly after takeoff from the Boise Airport on February 3, 2012.

== Career ==
Appleton started his career at Micron shortly after graduation from BSU in 1983, working the night shift in production for less than five dollars an hour. He held a variety of positions in the company, including wafer fab manager, production manager, director of manufacturing, and vice president of manufacturing before being appointed president and COO in 1991. Appleton was appointed CEO and chairman of the board in 1994 at age 34. In January 1996, he was fired and then rehired eight days later.

He formerly served on the board of directors for SEMATECH, the Idaho State Supreme Court Advisory Council, and was appointed by the Clinton Administration to serve on the National Semiconductor Technology Council. At the time of his death, he was serving on the board of directors for the Semiconductor Industry Association, and the board of directors for National Semiconductor Corporation, The U.S. Technology CEO Council, and was a member of the World Semiconductor Council and the Idaho Business Council. After his death, Mark Durcan assumed Appleton's position as CEO of Micron.

In 2011 he received the Robert Noyce Award from the Semiconductor Industry Association.

== Personal life ==
Appleton participated in a number of sports, including professional tennis. His hobbies included scuba diving, surfing, wakeboarding, motorcycling, and more recently, off-road car racing. His aviation background included multiple ratings and professional performances at air shows in both propeller and jet-powered aircraft. He also had a black belt in taekwondo.

On the 43rd edition of the Tecate SCORE Baja 1000 on 2010, Appleton finished 1st on a SCORE Class 1 buggy and 7th overall with a time of 20:32.18.

He was married to his wife Dalynn, and had 4 children.

== Death ==
On February 3, 2012, Appleton was killed while attempting an emergency landing in a Lancair IV-PT experimental-category, four-seat, turboprop airplane at the Boise Airport, moments after taking off. He had aborted a take off a few minutes earlier for unknown reasons.

Eight years earlier in 2004 with a passenger aboard and several miles south of the same airport, Appleton had a serious plane crash piloting an Extra 300; he sustained a punctured lung, head injuries, ruptured disk, and broken bones. The passenger was a Micron employee and was also injured; he was photographing Appleton for an upcoming corporate presentation.
