= Mark Durcan =

American businessman

D. Mark Durcan (born April 28, 1961) is the former chief executive officer (CEO) of Micron Technology. Prior to being appointed Micron's CEO in February 2012, he held a variety of positions including process integration engineer, process integration manager, process development manager, vice president of research and development, chief technical officer and president. Durcan initially announced his decision to retire from Micron on February 2, 2012, while he was serving as President of Micron. On February 3, Micron CEO Steve Appleton died in a plane accident. On February 6, Durcan was named CEO and postponed his retirement. Five years later, on February 2, 2017, Durcan announced his plan to retire.

He currently serves on the Semiconductor Industry Association Board and the Tech CEO Council. Durcan is also the chairman of the Micron Technology Foundation, Inc., which was formed to advance science and technology education and support civic and charitable institutions in the communities in which Micron has facilities. In 2015, Durcan was listed as person #415 on Forbes CEO Compensation list.

A Rice University alumnus, Durcan earned a Master of Chemical Engineering and a Bachelor of Science in Chemical Engineering.
