= Steam hardware =

List of hardware from Valve Corporation

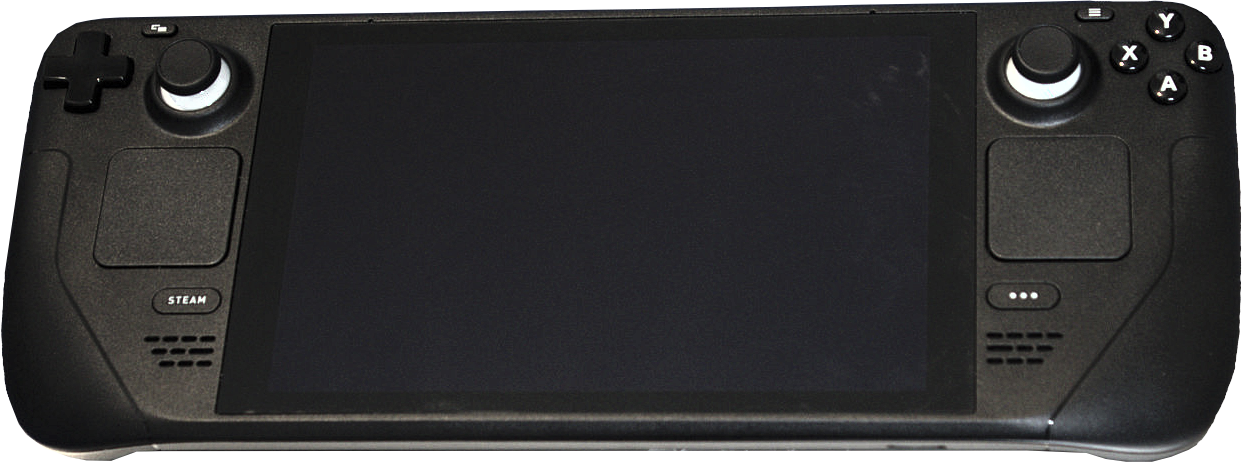
Front of a Steam Deck

Valve has developed various pre-built computers, virtual reality headsets, controllers, and other peripherals. Primarily seen alongside hardware is SteamOS, a Linux distribution that often uses Proton for compatibility with games for Windows. The line-up began with the original Steam Machines line, Steam Link set-top box, and the Steam Controller. These would go on to be considered failures when Steam Machines were quietly removed from the storefront, excluding the Valve Index. In-between the original line-up and their original VR headset, Valve worked with HTC for the first generation HTC Vive headset released in 2016 with success in virtual reality gaming.

Steam hardware timeline
2015	Steam Machines
2015	Steam Link
2015	Steam Controller
2016	HTC Vive
2017
2018
2019	Valve Index
2020
2021
2022	Steam Deck
2023	Steam Deck OLED
2024
2025
2026	Steam Controller
2026	Steam Machine
2026	Steam Frame

With the success of the Steam Deck handheld launched in 2022, Valve was set to work in the hardware market again. Later in 2025, Valve announced the Steam Machine, Steam Frame, and Steam Controller with IGN saying Valve is "making its own gaming tech ecosystem" with SteamOS being a major factor.

== Computers ==
=== Steam Machine (2015) ===
The Steam Machines are a family of small form PCs co-developed by various hardware developers. They first started in 2015 and ended in 2018. They were considered a failure due to the lack of Valve's own control on hardware ideas and limited support for non-Linux games.

=== Steam Deck (2022) ===
The Steam Deck is a handheld PC released on February 25, 2022. It includes remappable controls, touch-sensitive pads similar to the 2015 Steam Controller, and four new rear buttons. It was widely praised for its powerful portability and sparked a public interest in gaming handheld PCs. The Steam Deck Docking Station was released a few months later in October 6, 2022.

On November 16, 2023, Valve released an enhanced OLED model and later began phasing out LCD Steam Decks by the end of 2025.

=== Steam Machine (2026) ===
The Steam Machine is a small form factor PC released on June 29, 2026. Compared to its predecessor, it tackles former issues by now being fully developed by Valve and having Proton to extend the library of games greatly.

== Peripherals ==
=== Steam Link (2015) ===
The physical Steam Link was a set-top box made exclusively for the Steam Link function, which can let users stream games from PCs to smart TVs and other set-top boxes. It is one of the only Valve-made hardware to not use SteamOS, instead having a lite operating system based on the Linux kernel. Games that can be streamed include non-Steam games and games using Proton.

=== Steam Controller (2015) ===
The Steam Controller is a gamepad released on November 10, 2015. Being paired with the Steam launcher's ability to remap to take into account for traditional PC games using keyboard and mouse, it has two touch-sensitive trackpads, one analog stick, and an ABXY layout similar to Xbox controllers. They were discontinued in 2019 and later revised in 2025.

The controller would be part of litigation, as the controller was involved in a lawsuit between Ironburg Inventions. This was due to rear buttons apart of Ironburg's patented design. The jury found Valve had infringed on the patent.

=== Steam Controller (2026) ===
The revised Steam Controller was released on May 4, 2026. It includes designs taken from the Steam Deck, such as the rear buttons and touchpads. It is bundled with the Steam Machine in some models.

== Headsets ==
=== HTC Vive (2015) ===
The HTC Vive is a virtual reality headset released on April 5, 2016, it was co-developed by HTC and Valve. It uses the SteamVR platform. The headset uses lighthouse tracking and motion controllers and room-scaling virtual reality, one of the firsts in VR gaming. The headset was able to be used with macOS and would be the only one to ever use it prior to SteamVR's end of support for macOS.

=== Valve Index (2019) ===
The Valve Index is a virtual reality headset released on June 28, 2019. It was the first headset developed fully by Valve and included a free copy of Half-Life: Alyx available for download when it released. It includes headphones and uses lighthouse tracking similar to its predecessor, the HTC Vive. The headset also retains backwards compatibility with some HTC Vive accessories.

=== Steam Frame (2026) ===
The Steam Frame is a virtual reality headset released on September 18, 2026. Compared to its predecessor, it uses Inside-out tracking rather than external lighthouse-based tracking, and it is capable of running standalone without being connected to a host PC. As with the Valve Index, the Steam Frame also includes a free copy of Half-Life: Alyx.

== Philosophy ==
The traditional console model is to sell hardware at a loss and make up the revenue with subscription services or by selling games that are locked-in to the hardware.

— Steam Machine FAQ

Common phrasing seen around Valve-made hardware is that it is not posed as a console, rather as a pre-built gaming PC or "living room PC". This is apparent with the inclusion of SteamOS, which allows users to exit "Gaming Mode" to enter in the desktop environment to run programs.

The inclusion of SteamOS is related to Valve's push for Linux gaming as it would no longer be limited to Windows, which has the largest userbase for gaming.
