= Steam Controller (2026) =

Game controller by Valve

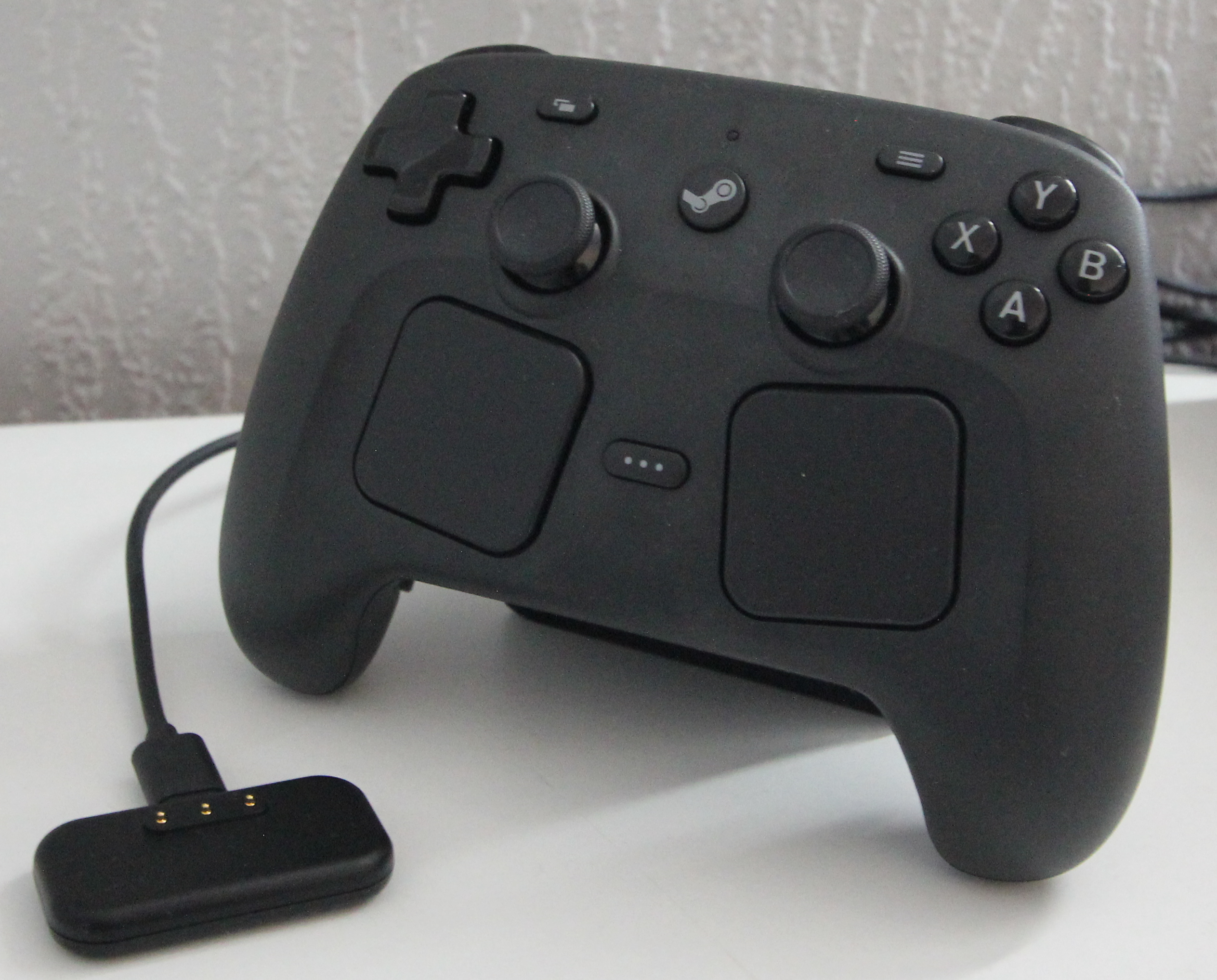
- Steam Controller with included "puck" accessory
- Codename: Triton (controller); Proteus and Nereid (wireless adapters)
- Also known as: Steam Controller (2026)
- Developer: Valve
- Type: Gamepad
- Generation: Ninth
- Released: May 4, 2026
- Introductory price: US$99 / €99 / ¥17,800
- Input: 2 × clickable analog sticks with capacitive touch (L3, R3); 2 × pressure sensitive touchpads; 2 × capacitive grip sensors; 20 × buttons (A/B/X/Y, D-pad, 2 × shoulder [L1, R1], 2 × analog triggers [L2, R2], 4 × grip [L4, R4, L5, R5], View, Menu, Steam, Quick Access); 6 axis IMU (3 axis accelerometer, 3 axis gyroscope)
- Connectivity: USB-C; Bluetooth
- Power: 8.39 Wh Li-ion battery
- Dimensions: 111 × 159 × 57 mm (4.4 × 6.3 × 2.2 in)
- Weight: 292 g (10.3 oz)
- Predecessor: Steam Controller (1st generation)
- Website: Official website

The Steam Controller is a game controller developed by Valve and released in 2026 for use with personal computers on Windows, macOS or Linux (SteamOS) running Steam as well as smartphones, tablet computers and smart TVs running Steam Link and the Steam Frame virtual reality headset. As a successor to the original Steam Controller from 2015, the controller was designed not only for games developed for controllers, but also for games designed to be played with keyboard and mouse. It was released on May 4, 2026.

== Design ==
The design is similar to Steam Deck without the built-in screen. It features all the same control inputs, with two haptic trackpads below each joystick, four grip buttons on the back of the controller, gyroscopic controls, and additional capacitive sensors on the back grips. The analog sticks use tunnel magnetoresistance sensors (TMR) to combat joystick drifting issues. The controller features infrared LEDs for positional tracking when used in tandem with the Steam Frame.

The 8.39Wh lithium-ion battery is rated to last for about 35 hours of gameplay. The controller can be charged with either the included "puck" accessory or a USB-C connection, and the firmware is optimized for long-term battery health. If any components need to be replaced, the controller can be opened with a T6 Torx driver; there are no clips, adhesives, or custom fasteners.

The controller is intended to connect to a PC through the use of a proprietary 2.4GHz wireless USB-C "puck" that doubles as a magnetic charging dock. It can also connect via Bluetooth, albeit with substantially higher signal latency. The controller can also recharge and send input by connecting via the bundled USB-C cable itself. Both the puck and controller contain a magnet that may attract nearby metallic items. Valve advise that users remove any metallic objects near the charging puck and controller before establishing a connection.

The controller has an easter egg that occasionally plays a Wilhelm scream if dropped from a high enough distance. The iconic scream is generated through the controller's haptic motors.

== Development ==
On November 19, 2024, several news outlets reported on inside information that a new Steam Controller was in the works. On November 26, 2024, a render of the device first leaked online.

On November 12, 2025, Valve announced a newly designed Steam Controller alongside the second iteration of the Steam Machine and the standalone VR headset Steam Frame. The base price of US$99 was announced on April 27, 2026, with sales starting shortly before 10:00 PDT (UTC−07:00) on May 4, 2026. It sold out in approximately 30 minutes.

On May 6, Valve released controller and puck CAD files under a Creative Commons license (Creative Commons BY-NC-SA) for modders' use.

On June 22, Valve opened waitlists to order the Steam Machine, where the Steam Controller will be packaged with some models of the new hardware. The Steam Controller will come with the US$1,128 and US$1,428 options, adding an extra US$79 in price compared to the base 512 GB and 2 TB models without controllers.
