= JerryRigEverything =

American YouTuber (born 1988)

Zack Nelson
- Nelson in 2020
- Born: Zack Nelson; June 29, 1988 (age 38); United States
- Occupation: YouTuber

YouTube information
- Channel: JerryRigEverything
- Years active: 2012–present
- Subscribers: 10 million
- Views: 3.008 billion
- Last updated: August 9, 2026
- Website: jerryrigeverything.com

Zack Nelson (born June 29, 1988), better known by his username JerryRigEverything, is an American YouTuber, internet personality and founder of a business that makes custom and off-road wheelchairs. He is known for teardown videos where he takes various tech products and disassembles them by any force necessary, typically resulting in the product in question getting severely damaged. He has a background in construction and documented the process of building a bunker in his backyard on his channel.

== Career ==
=== Wheelchair business ===
After building an off-road wheelchair for his wife, Nelson started a business in 2020 to build and sell the vehicle to the general public.

=== Casetify plagiarism accusation ===
In November 2023 Nelson, together with Dbrand, sued Casetify due to plagiarism of their "teardown" case designs. The cases show a picture of the internal components of the device they are designed to fit. The original designs included unique Easter eggs which also appeared on the cases made by Casetify. After Nelson published a video that compares his cases to those made by Casetify, Casetify pulled their cases from their website.

=== Cybertruck and clash with Musk ===
In 2024, Nelson put the "bulletproof" claims of the Tesla Cybertruck to the test and found out that while handgun rounds were stopped, various faster rounds would penetrate the vehicle. In March 2025, he tested the strength of the frame of the vehicle. While it was found to be stronger than expected, he concluded that a vehicle with a steel frame is a better option as it will bend when over-stressed instead of breaking without warning.

Nelson owns a Cybertruck which he considers a part of his business. In late 2024, the vehicle caused one of his sponsors to decline featuring in a video due to negative associations with the CEO of the manufacturer of the vehicle, Elon Musk. Nelson became concerned about being seen as supportive of Musk's controversial statements and considered selling the vehicle. In March 2025, Nelson removed his company logo from the vehicle and stated he plans to sell it later that year.

In February 2025, Nelson clashed with Musk on social media, criticizing Musk's political activity and treatment of his children. Musk responded by saying "Jerry is an utter liar. I have always paid extremely generous child support and without any coercion to do so".

== Personal life ==
Zack Nelson was born on June 29, 1988. Nelson married Cambry Kaylor in 2019. Both Nelson and his wife are members of The Church of Jesus Christ of Latter-day Saints. In 2022, Nelson raised money to build a library in Kenya.
