= Casetify =

Hong Kong phone accessories company

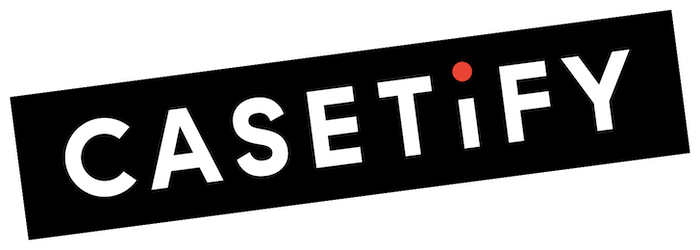
- Formerly: Casetagram
- Type: Private
- Founded: 1 November 2011; 14 years ago in Hong Kong
- Founder: Ronald Yeung; Wesley Ng
- Area served: Worldwide
- Products: Phone accessories
- Revenue: ~US$300 million (2022)
- Number of employees: 1,000
- Website: casetify.com

Casetagram Limited, trading as Casetify, is a Hong Kong company that produces phone cases and electronic accessories. Founded on 1 November 2011 by Wesley Ng and Ronald Yeung, the company first featured custom phone cases by using Instagram photos. It later expanded to selling accessories with different designs. It has sold more than 25 million phone cases.

The company is headquartered in Hong Kong and has offices in Los Angeles.

== History ==
Formerly Casetagram, Casetify's initial products were customized cell phone cases created using the purchaser's Instagram photos. Users could upload images from Instagram to an interface that allowed them create a custom collage or single-image case. Users can now create custom cases using photos from Instagram and Facebook, or by directly uploading photographs and adding custom text. Casetify also produces additional products such as tech accessories.

The company has brick and mortar locations in the United States, Hong Kong (including a flagship store in the city's Landmark Mall complex), Japan, South Korea, and a pop-up store in Bangkok, Thailand.

=== Partnerships and collaborations ===
To create cases, Casetify works with galleries, museums, and artists. The Louvre collection features art by Leonardo da Vinci, Eugène Delacroix, and ancient works such as the Venus de Milo. The Metropolitan Museum of Art partnered with Casetify to produce licensed products featuring the art of Vincent van Gogh, Degas, and Monet. Casetify has also partnered with individual artists including David Shrigley and Yayoi Kusama to produce collections featuring their work.

Casetify has also collaborated with more than 100 companies, including brands such as DHL, Blanc & Eclare, Pokémon, Pixar, Lucasfilm, Vetements, and K-pop groups BTS and Blackpink for product collections. Food companies such as Coca-Cola, Oreo, and Vegemite have also collaborated along with sporting companies such as the NBA, MLB, and the AFL. Collections commonly feature phone cases; however, other items such as watch straps and earbud cases are included in certain collaborations.

=== Plagiarism allegations and lawsuit ===
On 23 November 2023, YouTuber Zack Nelson, known online as JerryRigEverything, uploaded a video where he announced that he and case manufacturer dbrand had filed a multi-million dollar federal lawsuit against Casetify for plagiarizing product designs relating to their "Teardown" line of items. The video claimed that Casetify had either copied or modified multiple exclusive designs by dbrand and JerryRigEverything. Nelson shared numerous Easter eggs that were included within the dbrand designs that were present in Casetify products, as well as demonstrating that the designs from Casetify were direct replicas of dbrand, with only some slight changes made. Less than an hour following the release of the YouTube video, the Casetify website experienced downtime, and upon restoration, the products featured in the video were no longer available. Casetify later released a statement that they are investigating on the allegations and mentioned that the cause of the downtime was a DDOS attack.

On the following day, Casetify was accused of stealing x-ray images of the iPhone X from iFixit's design and using it on their "X-Ray Case" line of items.
