= Steam Machine =

Gaming computer by Valve

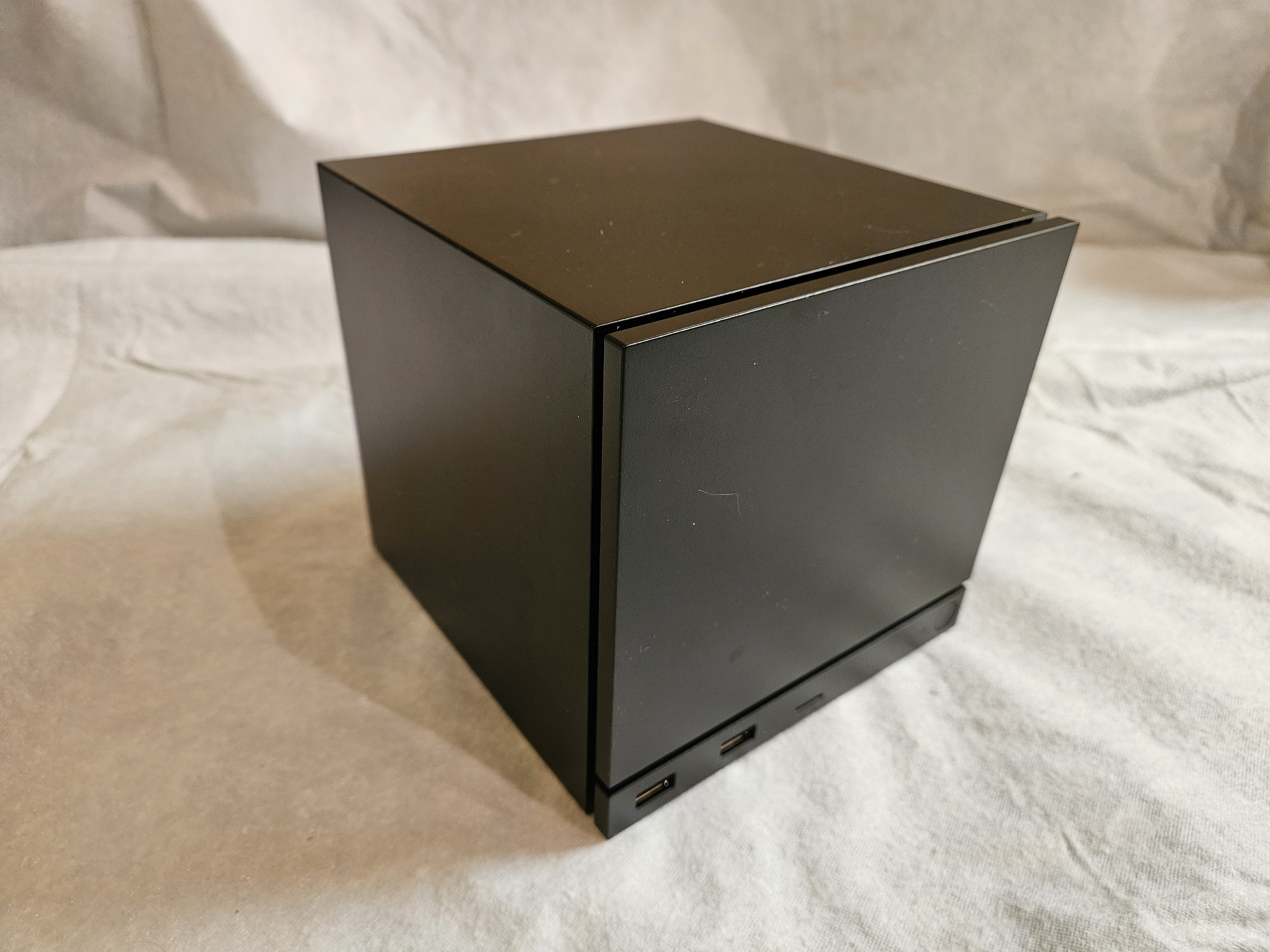
- Codename: Fremont
- Developer: Valve
- Type: Gaming computer
- Released: June 29, 2026
- Introductory price: 512 GB (w/ controller); US$1,049 (US$1,128); €1,039 (€1,108); ¥189,980 (¥204,980); 2 TB (w/ controller); US$1,349 (US$1,428); €1,359 (€1,428); ¥249,980 (¥264,980)
- Operating system: SteamOS
- CPU: Semi-custom AMD Zen 4 6C / 12T; up to 4.8 GHz, 30W TDP (comparable to Ryzen 5 7540U)
- Memory: 16 GB DDR 5 (single-channel) (2× SO-DIMM slots)
- Storage: 512 GB, 2 TB (M.2 2230) (1× M.2 2280 slot)
- Removable storage: microSD
- Display: 720p, 1080p, 1440p, 4K
- Graphics: Semi-Custom AMD RDNA 3 28CUs; up to 2.45GHz, 110W TDP; 8GB GDDR6 VRAM (comparable to Radeon RX 7600M)
- Sound: HDMI, DisplayPort
- Controller input: Steam Controller
- Connectivity: 2× USB-A 3.2 Gen 1 ports (front); 1× USB-C (USB 3.2 Gen 2) port (back); 2× USB-A 2.0 High Speed ports (back); 1× microSD slot (front); 1× Gigabit Ethernet port (back); Wi-Fi 6E 2x2; Bluetooth 5.3 with dedicated antenna; integrated 2.4 GHz wireless adapter (Steam Controller); 1× DisplayPort 1.4 (up to 4K @ 240Hz or 8K@60Hz; supports HDR, FreeSync, and daisy-chaining); 1× HDMI 2.0 (up to 4K @ 120Hz; supports HDR, FreeSync, and CEC)
- Power: Internal 110-240V
- Online services: Steam
- Dimensions: 156 × 152 × 162.4 mm (6.14 × 5.98 × 6.39 in)
- Weight: 2.6 kg (5.7 lb)
- Predecessor: Steam Machine (2015)
- Website: store.steampowered.com/hardware/steammachine

The Steam Machine is a small form factor gaming computer by Valve, designed to operate SteamOS and the digital Steam storefront, and provide a home game console-like experience. Unlike Valve's previous attempt with the original Steam Machine concept, where it had established minimum specifications for other hardware vendors to build towards, the new Steam Machine is manufactured directly by Valve, though users may still build their own equivalent using SteamOS.

The Steam Machine was announced on November 12, 2025, and was released on June 29, 2026, as part of a broader Steam hardware lineup, including the next-generation Steam Controller and the Steam Frame.

== History ==
Valve introduced the first iteration of the Steam Machine in 2015. In their approach, Valve did not manufacture any hardware (outside of the first iteration of the Steam Controller and Steam Link), but instead set a minimum specification for computer manufacturers to build towards to support SteamOS and dedicated to playing games from Steam. This also allowed users themselves to create their own Steam Machine from their own components. This approach did not garner significant sales, and the initial Steam Machine was discontinued in 2018.

Valve used lessons learned from the failure of Steam Machines to create the Steam Deck in 2021, a handheld console designed to play games running the Arch Linux-based SteamOS. As it was difficult to get developers to build for Linux systems and reach thresholds for adoption to convince manufacturers to produce Steam Machines, Valve invested into Proton, a compatibility layer for Linux to run Windows-based application and games, as well as an improved version of SteamOS. The hesitation of their manufacturing partners from Steam Machines also led Valve to keep development of Steam Deck internally, so as to build a better product. The Steam Deck was considered a success and led to several similar handheld computer devices including the Asus ROG Ally and Lenovo Legion Go.

On November 12, 2025, Valve announced the Steam Machine, alongside the second generation of Steam Controller and Steam Frame, due for release in 2026. Unlike the first generation of Steam Machines, the new Steam Machine will be produced with specific technical specifications by Valve directly. According to Valve's engineers, the original Steam Machine concept had failed due to the lack of games, driving players away from SteamOS, which then led to developers not making more games for it. However, the Proton compatibility layer opens up the system to a far wider range of games, thereby giving a stronger reason to purchase it. In addition they had seen some users had already begun to build their own small form factor computers with the updated SteamOS to connect to televisions similar to home gaming consoles. The console has a tightly integrated form factor, primarily designed around the 120 millimetres (4.7 in) cooling fan. This led to the cube-like shape, as well as targeting a size that could fit into most entertainment consoles. The similarities between this shape and that of the GameCube have resulted in community members nicknaming the new Steam Machine the "GabeCube", in reference to Gabe Newell, the president of Valve. At this point, Valve had anticipated the Steam Machine price would be "more in line with what you might expect from [the] current PC market". While Valve was set to manufacture the new Steam Machine, their intent prior to launch was to also enable third-party manufacturers to produce their own versions.

Later, Valve announced a delay in shipping as well as a need to revisit the cost of the Steam Machine in February 2026, citing the increasing costs of RAM due to the memory supply shortage. On June 22, 2026, Valve opened registration for reservations for the Steam Machine via the Steam storefront, with purchases to start June 29. Valve provided the specifications for the Steam Machine and various bundles, along with prices, showing that the base price had exceeded US$1,000. Valve engineers said the price was significantly higher than expected, driven up by the global computer component shortage from AI data centers, and had been looking at costs closer to the Steam Deck's pricing originally. Valve said the RAM producers were generally driving these costs, as according to one Valve employee, "They give us a price every month or something and they say 'You can buy that many' and it's yes or no. And if we say no, then they never talk to us again." Valve, at another point, stated that the difference between the Steam Machine's initial target and launch pricing is similar to the Steam Deck's price changes, leading to speculation that its initial target price was around $800. The rising cost of RAM also hindered the ability of third-party manufacturers to produce equal Steam Machine models as Valve had originally intended. Valve engineers, in July 2026, said they do not expect memory prices to decrease until at least the end of the year.

=== Launch ===
Registrations for Steam Machines were open on June 22, 2026, which would be then be randomized for ordering purposes, as to avoid issues Valve had on initial sale with the second generation Steam Controller. There are two primary configurations, a 512 GB retailing for $1049 and a 2 TB version for $1348. Both versions also included a version with a Steam Controller for additional cost. The units will then be sold starting June 29, 2026, following the randomized waitlist. Despite the reservation system, some users were selling their reservation slots on eBay and other auction sites, with some going for more than double Valve's listed price.

Valve continued to fulfill orders until November 2026, announcing they would no longer offer waitlist placements due to the ongoing RAM shortage. While all current reservations for the 512 GB unit were expected to be fufilled, Valve cautioned that they may have issues with fulfilling reservations for the 2 TB unit.

== Hardware ==
The base Steam Machine is roughly cubical, measuring 156 by 152 by 162 millimeters (6.1 in × 6.0 in × 6.4 in) and weighing 2.6 kilograms (5.7 lb). The CPU is a custom AMD Zen 4 most comparable to the Ryzen 5 7540U, with 6 cores, 12 threads, and running up to 4.8 GHz clock rate. The GPU is a custom AMD RDNA 3 with 28 compute units running at a 2.45 GHz sustained clock with 8GB GDDR6 (equivalent to Radeon RX 7600M GPU). The base memory is 16 GB of DDR5 SO-DIMM; the memory can be upgraded by the user.

The unit will include DisplayPort and HDMI video output, gigabit ethernet, wireless internet connectivity using WiFi 6e, Bluetooth wireless connectivity, and a dedicated radio connection for the Steam Controller, along with four USB-A and two USB-C ports. The front of the unit includes a customizable 17-unit LED bar and a removable bezel front.

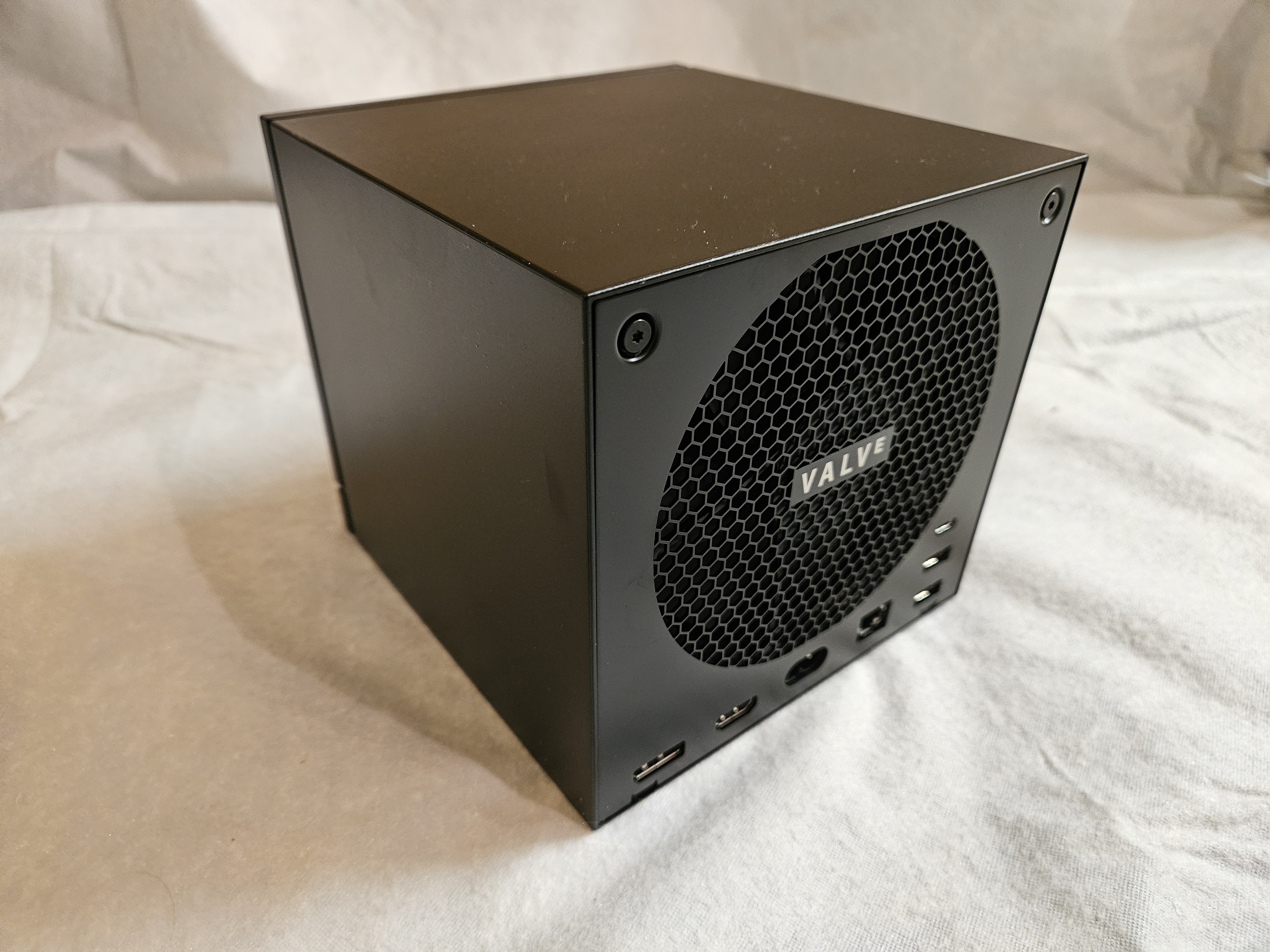
Rear of the Steam Machine

Though Valve had initially claimed the Steam Machine would support 4K resolution at 60 frames per second with both AMD's FidelityFX Super Resolution (FSR) and ray-tracing active, which had made it six times more powerful than the Steam Deck according to Valve's estimates, the company quietly updated the specifications just prior to release to say that "up to 4K gaming with FSR 4.1". According to IGN's Jacqualine Thomas, while Valve's initial claim was possible with the Steam Machine, it required significant amount of tweaking settings to work, whereas the new statement is more representative for most games on the device without additional tweaks. Gaming journalists said that the defined specifications place the Steam Machine on par with the ninth generation of video game consoles, the PlayStation 5 and the Xbox Series S. The Steam Machine shipped with two different storage configuations, 512 GB and 2 TB. Internal storage is expandable using 2230/2280 NVMe solid-state drives, as well as swappable storage through a MicroSD card slot. Initial bundles also optionally included the second-generation Steam Controller.

When the Steam Machine was first announced, potential buyers and accessory vendors began suggesting ideas for the front bezel replacement for customization of the unit. Dbrand had early on offered a front bezel based on the Companion Cube from Valve's Portal. Just prior to the release of the Steam Machine, Dbrand was forced to pull this from sale as they had failed to secure the rights from Valve for the intellectual property.

In July 2026, Valve released CAD design files for the Steam Machine's exterior.

== Software ==
=== SteamOS ===
The Steam Machine is loaded with SteamOS 3.x, a derivative of Arch Linux designed for running Steam and games offered by it, similar to the Steam Deck.

Similar to the red ring of death on the Xbox 360, the Steam Machine LED bar uses a red LED pattern to indicate any hardware or software errors that prevent the system from starting up normally.

Valve released Windows drivers for the Steam Machine shortly after release, allowing one to wipe SteamOS install in favor of Windows. Dual-booting is not yet supported.

While Valve is the only manufacturer of the Steam Machine, SteamOS gained support in version 3.8 for installation on non-Valve-approved computers, which Valve sees as an alternative for users to build Steam Machine variants using their own hardware. In at least one case, the French vendor LDLC offered a SteamOS-compatible computer with equivalent specs as the Steam Machine at a slightly lower cost, sold formally as the LDLC PC Box but had briefly earned the moniker the "Stim Machine". Other tech websites offered parts lists that would allow users to also create their own SteamOS-ready computer systems comparable to the Steam Machine at lower costs.

=== Games and applications ===
Valve will implement a program similar to Steam Deck's verification to assess the compatibility of games on the Steam Machine with the Proton compatibility layer that allows Windows-based games to run in Linux. Games already deemed Steam Deck Verified will automatically be verified to work well on the Steam Machine, which includes being able to run at 30 frames per second at a display resolution of 1080p. For other titles, Valve plans to simplify the process to reach verified for Steam Machines, including VR requirements for Steam Frame games.
