= Steam Controller (1st generation) =

Game controller by Valve from 2015

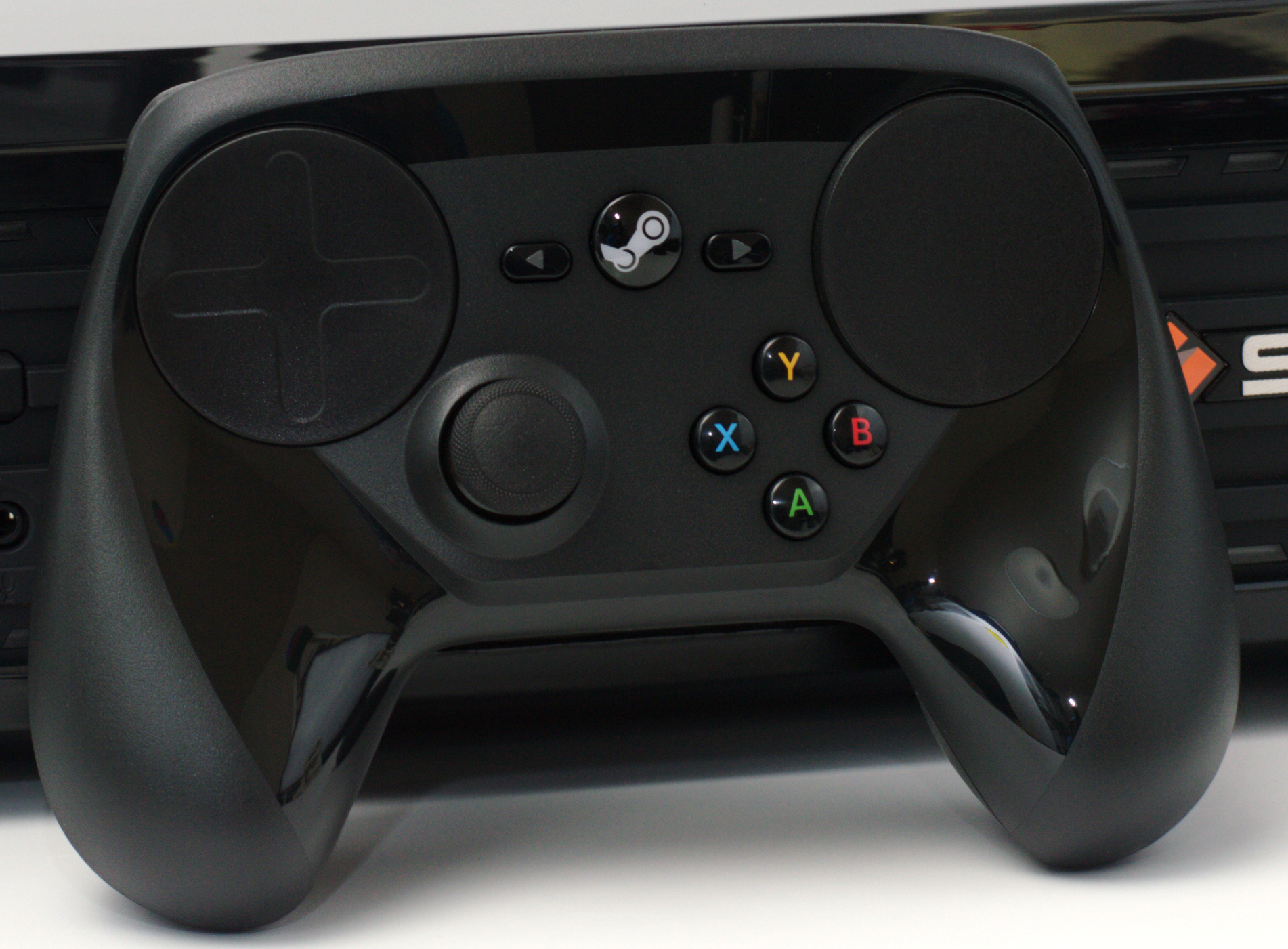
- Developer: Valve
- Product family: Steam Hardware (1st Generation)
- Type: Gamepad
- Released: November 10, 2015
- Introductory price: US$49.99 / €54.99 / ¥7,000
- Discontinued: November 27, 2019
- Input: 1 × clickable analog stick; 2 × pressure sensitive touchpads; D-pad (via left touchpad); 2 × analog triggers (LT, RT); 11 × buttons; A/B/X/Y; 2 × shoulder (LB, RB); 2 × grip (LG, RG); Back, Start, Steam; 6 axis motion sensing (3 axis accelerometer, 3 axis gyroscope)
- Connectivity: Micro-USB; Bluetooth; USB-A Receiver
- Power: 2 × AA batteries
- Model Number: Model 1001
- Successor: Steam Controller (2026)
- Website: https://store.steampowered.com/app/353370/Steam_Controller_2015

The Steam Controller is a game controller developed by Valve for use with personal computers on Windows, macOS or Linux (SteamOS) running Steam along with smartphones, tablet computers and smart TVs running Steam Link. The controller was designed not only for games developed for controller users, but also for games traditionally played with keyboard and mouse controls. It was released in November 2015 along with Valve's Steam Machine and discontinued in November 2019.

A second generation Steam Controller was announced in November 2025, alongside a new virtual reality headset named Steam Frame, and a second incarnation of the Mini-PC-esque Steam Machine.

== Design ==
The Steam Controller features two clickable trackpads (as opposed to the more typical thumb-sticks on modern console controllers) and fourteen buttons, including face, shoulder, and under-grip buttons. The trackpads include haptic feedback; Chris Kohler of Wired described using the controller while playing Civilization V at a Valve press event, noting that as he used the trackpad to move the mouse cursor, the electromagnets within the controller created audio and tactile feedback as if he were using a trackball. Although the controller was designed for the Steam Machine platform, it can also be used with Steam on existing PCs. The controller also included gyroscopic sensors to detect the relative orientation of the controller.

A representative configuration page for the Steam Controller, which demonstrates the array of settings that can be adjusted on a per-game basis

The controller is presently modified to be used within Steam's Big Picture mode; this enables the player to access detailed options for setting up the various features of the controller on a per-game basis, including button/trackpad mapping and sensitivity, as well as accessing other users' shared controller configuration to use themselves. The Steamworks API allowed for developers to provide more detailed settings for the Steam Controller when in Big Picture mode. Outside of Big Picture mode, the controller otherwise behaves as a standard two-stick controller, though Valve announced plans on updating Steam to allow retaining the previously set Big Picture mode per-game settings.

== Development ==
The original design of the controller was to include a touchscreen in the center of the unit. The touchscreen would have acted like a mousepad and allowed players to perform actions that typically are not capable on controllers, such as operating directly with Steam or SteamOS, and overlaying the touchscreen display onto the players' screens to allow manipulation of the game without diverting attention from the screen. However, at the January 2014 Steam Dev Days event, Valve revealed they had since dropped the touchscreen concept for the controller, instead rearranging the face buttons to be more compatible with existing games.

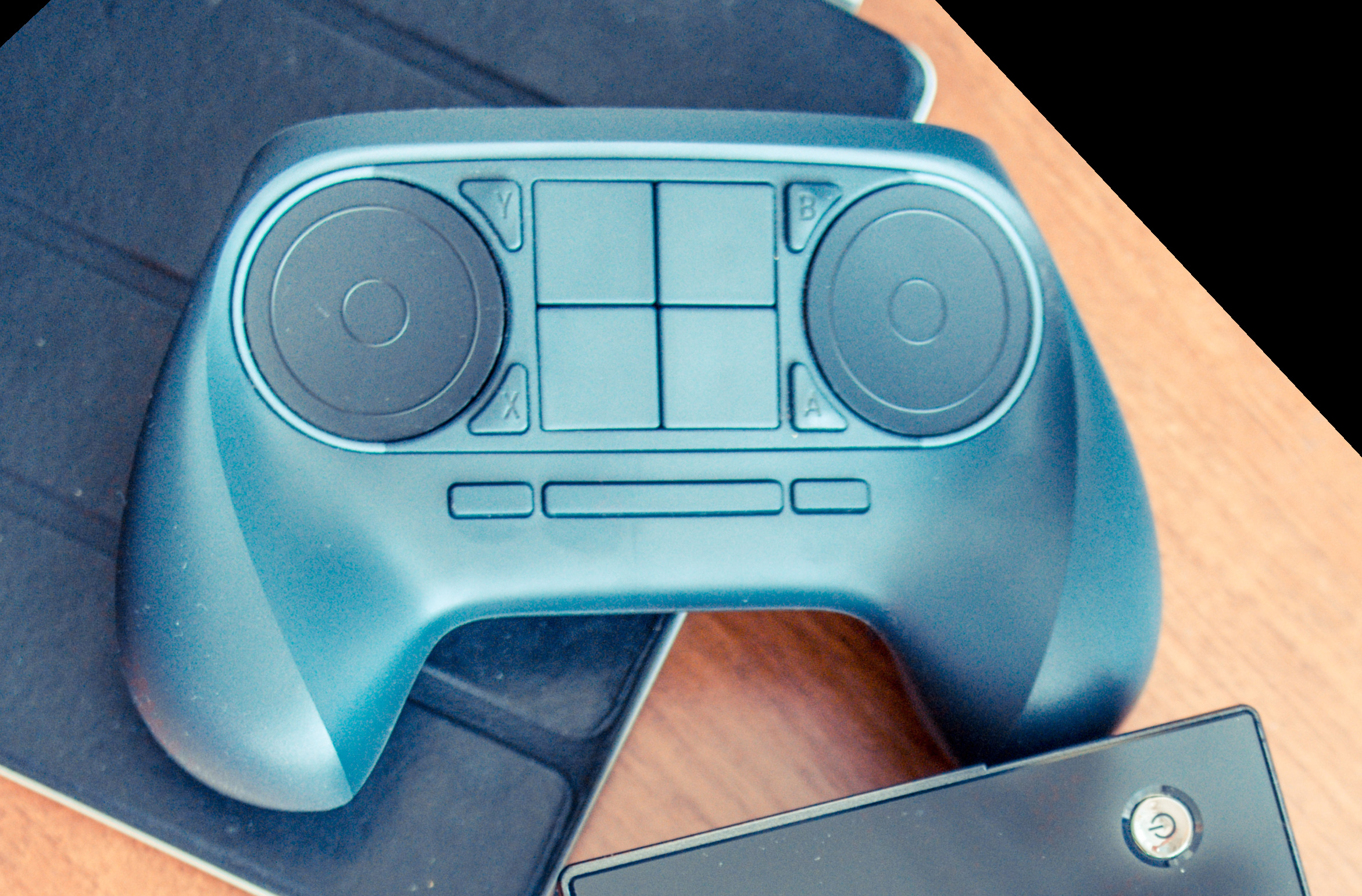
An early "Chell" prototype of the original Steam Controller

Valve went through several iterations for a controller that would be able to mimic keyboard and mouse controls, using prototypes made with 3D printing to test ergonomics. Early versions of the controller design included a trackball embedded in the controller to simulate mouse functionality, but Valve eventually opted for trackpads to give more customization functionality to developers, including the ability to simulate the motion of trackball by tracking a finger's motion on the trackpad. The trackpads and the controller design were made to minimize the amount of contact that a player's thumbs would make on the trackpad when holding the unit.

As opposed to their plans for the Steam Machine to be produced by multiple third-parties, Valve planned to be the sole producer of the Steam Controller; Valve's Greg Coomer stated that this decision was based on achieving the best implementation of the Controller and Valve's vision for the device, noting that "we didn’t think that it was really going to be possible to outsource the design for manufacturing and the finishing of the controller in a way that would allow third parties to take from us an idea or a reference design and bring it to market soon enough".

Valve did clarify that they would open up specifications for third-party controllers to be developed (which was done publicly as of March 2016). As of December 2015, Valve was working with Flex robotic assembly line in Buffalo Grove, Illinois to assemble the machines; said machines had been given Aperture Science branding, referencing the fictional company from Valve's Portal series, presumably until the product's later discontinuation.

== Release and reception ==
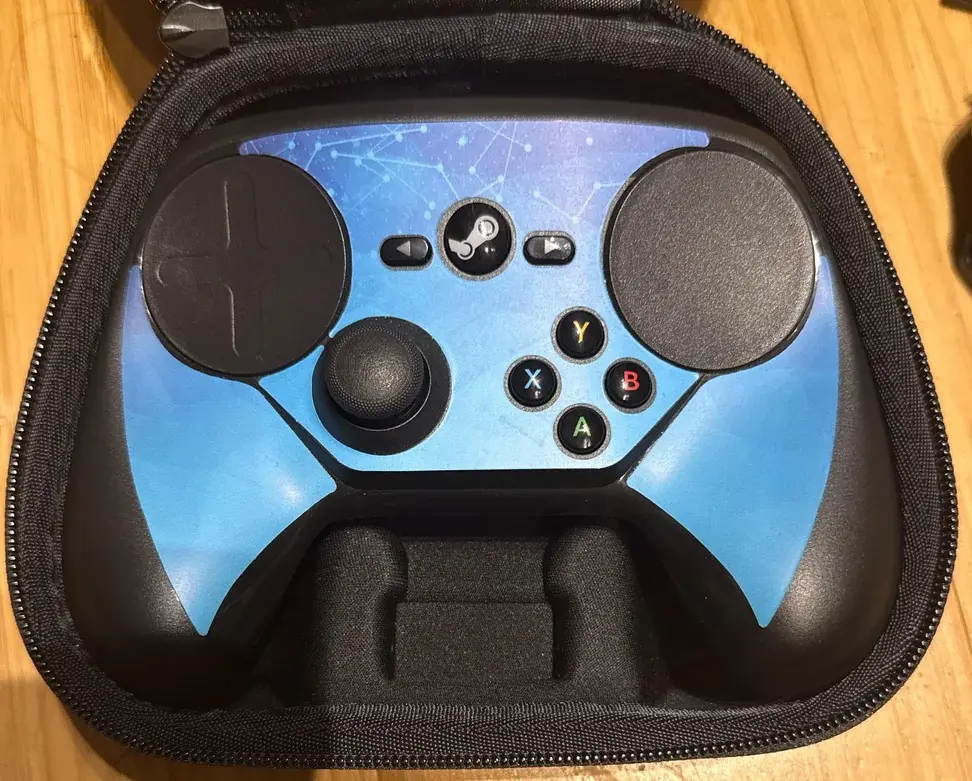
Version of the Steam Controller given away during the Steam Dev Days 2016 event

The Steam Controller was publicly released in November 2015, alongside the release of Steam Machines. By June 2016, over 500,000 had been sold, and by October, nearly one million were sold, including the controllers bundled with the Steam Machines. In October 2016, Valve disclosed 27,000 controllers were in "daily active use". In September 2018, Valve disclosed new figures showing approximately 1.5 million Steam Controllers connected to Steam, accounting to about 14% of those having been connected to Steam within the month the survey was performed. For comparison, the most popular controller used with Steam is the Xbox 360 controller, at around 27.2 million connections, with 14% of those connected within the month of the survey.

== Updates ==
Valve has pushed out updates aimed at increasing user customizability. Valve has added improvements to the controller's capabilities based on public feedback following its launch, including movement and aiming controls schemes using its internal gyroscope, the ability to trigger actions that enable cursor movements limited to certain regions on a UI (such as to manipulate a game's mini-map), a quick-access popup of 16 commands that can act similar to the hotkeys for keyboard-and-mouse games, cloud-based controller configuration saving, and support for non-Steam games that otherwise can be played through the Steam Overlay.

Several updates were introduced in June 2016. One update enabled users to create actions using the Controller to switch between two or more different configurations on the fly. This update also enabled the ability to customize the motion-sensing controls to be used for virtual reality games. A second update, in June 2016, enabled buttons to be 'Activators' which can respond differently based on the type of input on the button; distinguishing between a single short tap, an extended hold, and a double-tap, for example. These so called 'Activators' can also be used to simulate the constant holding of a button with a single press, such that as is often used for the action of crouching in many first-person or third-person shooters.

Valve, afterwards, worked on supporting similar controller customization features and user interfaces to other compatible controllers, and released one of its first such updates in the Steam software for Sony's DualShock 4 controller in December 2016, and a beta support for other controllers including Xbox One in January 2017. Support for the Nintendo Switch Pro Controller was added in May 2018. While other controllers can be used on Steam through basic operating system functionality.

On March 23, 2016, Valve announced it would be publicly releasing computer aided design geometry for the Steam controller. The CAD geometry was released under a Creative Commons license. In May 2018, Valve updated the controller to enable its Bluetooth communications, allowing it to pair with mobile devices. This allowed the controller to be used alongside the Steam Link app which replaced the Steam Link hardware.

The controller can be used on Linux without Steam since 2018 with Linux 4.18.

== Ironburg Inventions lawsuit ==
A lawsuit was filed against Valve by Ironburg Inventions, in 2020, asserting that Valve knowingly had violated their patent with the inclusion of the rear-face buttons after learning about Ironburg's patent in 2014. The jury trial started in January 2021. The jury found Valve had willfully infringed on the Ironburg patent, and awarded Ironburg $4 million in base damages.
