= Dbrand =

Canadian consumer electronics company

Dbrand Inc.
- Type: Private
- Industry: Consumer electronics accessories
- Founded: November 11, 2011; 14 years ago
- Founder: Adam Ijaz
- Headquarters: Toronto, Ontario, Canada
- Products: Skins, phone cases, screen protectors, accessories
- Website: dbrand.com

dbrand Inc. is a Canadian company that produces accessories for consumer electronics. It is based in Toronto, Ontario, and was founded on November 11, 2011, by Adam Ijaz. The company sells vinyl skins, cases, screen protectors, and related products for smartphones, laptops, gaming consoles, and other devices. It operates primarily through online direct sales. dbrand often takes a sarcastic tone in its marketing, which also involves mockery of other technology brands, which has landed it in controversies.

== Products ==
- Vinyl skins: Adhesive coverings made from 3M material, cut to fit phones, laptops, consoles, and other electronics.
- Phone cases: Includes rigid plastic, transparent, and reinforced models for various smartphone types. Some designs allow interchangeable vinyl panels or include extra impact protection.
- Screen protectors: Tempered glass covers marketed under the Prism name.
- Console plates: Replacement outer panels compatible with the PlayStation 5.
- Handheld console cases: Protective and modular shells for handheld gaming devices, such as the Steam Deck or the Nintendo Switch 2.
- Accessories: Cables, mounting brackets, and cleaning tools.

== Controversies ==
=== PlayStation 5 faceplates ===
In October 2021, dbrand released custom matte black PlayStation 5 (PS5) faceplates called Darkplates. dbrand's marketing of the product included a public challenge for Sony Interactive Entertainment to sue them, after Sony previously sued another company for manufacturing faceplates for the PS5. Sony later issued a cease-and-desist letter alleging design infringement. dbrand complied and temporarily pulled the product. They also posted the original letter on Reddit and remarked, "We've elected to submit to the terrorists' demands… for now." dbrand later returned their faceplates for sale and named them Darkplates 2.0, redesigned with additional ventilation to avoid infringement.

=== Twitter comment controversy ===
In April 2024, an Indian-origin customer named Bhuwan Chitransh complained about a defective MacBook skin on Twitter. dbrand responded by mocking his surname with the tweet: "Your last name is basically shit rash, be serious." The tweet sparked widespread backlash as racially insensitive and was viewed millions of times.

Tech YouTuber Marques Brownlee (MKBHD) stated that he would no longer work with the brand unless the tweet was deleted. dbrand deleted the tweet and issued a public apology the next day, calling the situation a "huge fumble" and offered Chitransh US$10,000 as a goodwill gesture. CEO Adam Ijaz acknowledged the remark as a "severe lapse in judgment" and promised future restraint.

=== Project Killswitch magnet issue ===
In June 2025, dbrand's Killswitch case for the Nintendo Switch 2 was found to interfere with Joy-Con controller connections due to poor tolerances. After initially blaming users, the company apologized publicly, describing their own response as "spectacularly terrible," and committed to sending free revised units.

=== Steam Machine Companion Cube cancellation ===
In November 2025, dbrand began registering interest for a Steam Machine case designed after the Weighted Companion Cube from the Valve franchise Portal. After opening pre-orders for the product on June 22, 2026, quickly becoming the second-fastest selling product in their history, the company received a cease and desist from Valve having failed to license the relevant intellectual property, and on June 29, after failed attempts to appeal and retroactively license the product, were forced to cancel all orders and begin processing refunds.
