= Steam Frame =

Virtual reality headset

- Steam Frame controllers, headset, and Wi-Fi adapter.
- Codename: Deckard (Headset); Roy (Controllers)
- Developer: Valve
- Type: Virtual reality headset
- Released: September 18, 2026
- Introductory price: US$1,059 (256 GB) / US$1,299 (1 TB)
- Media: Digital distribution
- Operating system: SteamOS
- System on a chip: Qualcomm Snapdragon 8 Gen 3
- CPU: ARM64
- Memory: 16 GB unified LPDDR5X RAM
- Storage: 256 GB UFS; 1 TB UFS
- Removable storage: microSD card slot
- Display: LCD 2160 × 2160 per eye @ 72–144 Hz (144 Hz experimental), 110-degree FOV
- Sound: Dual speaker drivers per ear, dual-microphone array
- Connectivity: Wi-Fi 7 (2 × 2, dual radios for 5 GHz and 6 GHz); Included wireless adapter (Wi-Fi 6E, 6 GHz, low-latency PC link); Bluetooth 5.4; USB-C 2.0 (rear, charging + data)
- Power: 21.6 Wh rechargeable lithium-ion battery; Charges over USB-C (45 W); AA battery (controllers)
- Online services: Steam
- Dimensions: 175 mm × 95 mm × 110 mm (6.9 in × 3.7 in × 4.3 in) (core module + facial interface)
- Weight: 440 g (core module + headstrap); 185 g (core module)
- Predecessor: Valve Index
- Website: store.steampowered.com/hardware/steamframe

The Steam Frame is a virtual reality headset developed by Valve. It was announced in November 2025 as part of a broader Steam hardware lineup. It launched on September 14, 2026 with a sign up system, with randomized order emails going out 4 days later.

Unlike its precursor, the Valve Index—which is a headset for PCs that requires external trackers, the Frame is a standalone headset similar to competitors such as Meta Quest, which uses inside-out tracking and is capable of running SteamVR and non-VR games natively using its SteamOS-based operating system (using the existing Proton compatibility layer for Windows software, as well as additional compatibility layers for Android software and x86-64 code), or streamed wirelessly from a PC over a local network using Steam Link.

Steam Frame received mixed reviews, with reviewers praising its design, the performance of games optimized to run natively on its ARM processor, the quality of its wireless PC streaming, and its theoretical versatility in comparison to Android-based competitors. However, it was criticized for inconsistent compatibility with existing games via emulation, the quality of its speakers, its battery life, and its high price due to the global memory supply shortage.

== Specifications ==
=== Hardware ===
The Steam Frame has a visor-like design similar to the Apple Vision Pro; Valve stated that the base unit had a weight of 185 grams (0.408 lb), and 440 grams (0.97 lb) when the default facial interface, battery, and strap is installed. It uses LCD displays viewed through thin, flat lenses, (specifically pancake lenses) with a per-eye resolution of 2160 × 2160, with a FOV of 110°, and support for refresh rates of 72, 80, 90, 120 and 144 Hz, and physical interpupillary distance adjustment via a knob. It supports eye tracking, which can be used for foveated rendering. The front portion of the strap contains the facial interface, dual speakers, and the microSD card slot, while the back portion features a USB-C 2.0 port and the battery.

The Steam Frame uses a Qualcomm Snapdragon 8 Gen 3 AArch64 system-on-chip with 16 GB of LPDDR5X memory, and is equipped with either 256 GB or 1 TB of UFS internal storage. Additional storage space is available through a microSD card slot; memory cards can be interchanged with the Steam Deck and the second-generation Steam Machine.

Wi-Fi connectivity is implemented with multiple Wi-Fi 7 radios in order to split internet and VR streaming traffic across 5 GHz and 6 GHz bands respectively. A Wi-Fi 6E USB adapter will be bundled with the Frame to provide a dedicated 6 GHz connection between a PC and the headset, bypassing local area networks to reduce latency and congestion. Use of the adapter is optional, and users will be able to stream over existing local Wi-Fi networks. The adapter and a local network can also be used in tandem, which Valve refers to as "multi-link streaming".

The front of the headset contains four monochrome passthrough cameras and infrared emitters for inside-out tracking using simultaneous localization and mapping (SLAM) similar to the Meta Quest 2. Its motion controllers are similar in design to the Touch Plus controllers used by the Meta Quest 3, but with a button layout similar to standard gamepads for improved usability with non-VR games, including a D-pad on the left controller and four face buttons on the right. The analog sticks use tunneling magnetoresistance similar to the second iteration of the Steam Controller, making them less susceptible to stick drift.

Valve will release CAD files and specifications to allow for the development of third-party accessories and attachments. The device includes an expansion port with a lane of PCI Express gen 4 connectivity and a MIPI camera interface. Hardware partner Arcturus has developed and will make available a camera accessory for the port using two color sensors for image passthrough as well as video and 3D captures. Valve has indicated the expansion port would be capable of supporting other accessories such as face tracking, depth sensors, full body tracking, and entirely different tracking solutions.

=== Software ===
The Steam Frame runs a version of Valve's Arch Linux-based operating system SteamOS, supporting both VR and non-VR games from Steam. Alongside the existing Proton compatibility layer for Windows games, the Steam Frame introduces two new layers known as Lepton and FEX; Lepton is a fork of Waydroid that provides an Android Open Source Project (AOSP)-based runtime environment with sideloading support. Lepton was developed primarily to support games targeting Android-based standalone headsets such as Meta Quest, and APKs can be published to Steam for distribution on Steam Frame. FEX provides a binary recompiler for running games compiled for x86 and x86-64 architectures on ARM platforms. Similarly to the Steam Deck, Steam classifies games tested for compatibility with the headset as being "Great on Frame".

VR software can be wirelessly streamed to the Frame from a gaming PC using Steam Link, with Valve emphasizing this functionality by promoting the device as a "streaming-first" headset. Streaming leverages an encoding technique Valve refers to as "foveated streaming", a variation of foveated rendering where eye tracking data is used to selectively increase the bitrate of the stream based on where the user is looking. Unlike foveated rendering, this technique is applied at the encoder level and does not require the game developer to support it.

== History ==
In 2021, Ars Technica reported from internal sources that Valve had multiple prototypes for a new VR headset, including a PC-based headset that would directly succeed the Valve Index, as well as a standalone headset similar to Oculus Quest. Over the course of the year, updates to the SteamVR runtimes began to add references to a device codenamed "Deckard", as well as functionality of relevance to standalone VR headsets. These changes were especially apparent on the ARM Linux builds of SteamVR. In September 2024, it was reported via data from SteamDB that Valve had been testing games on an AArch64 platform using FEX and Waydroid-based runtimes, including VR titles.

In September 2025, it was reported that Valve had filed for trademarks on the name "Steam Frame" for use on video game hardware. On November 12, 2025, Valve officially announced the Steam Frame as part of a new wave of hardware products, including the second-generation Steam Machine. It was planned to release in early 2026. Pricing details were not announced, but Valve stated that it expected the Steam Frame to be cheaper than the Index. In February 2026, Valve stated that the announcement of the final release date and pricing for the Steam Frame and Steam Machine had been delayed due to the global memory supply shortage, and that prices would be higher than anticipated. Valve still expected to release the devices in the first half of 2026. By June 2026, Valve said they planned to release the Steam Frame "this Summer". In July 2026, Collabora published an experimental build of Holo Core, an AArch64 port of Arch Linux for Steam Frame. SteamOS developer Pierre-Loup Griffais believed the use of ARM processors was a first step by Valve towards other devices using them, including future handhelds.

=== Launch ===
Reservations for pre-orders opened on September 14, 2026 for a release on September 18, 2026, using the same random draw system introduced for the Steam Machine release to reduce scalping; the 256 GB model was priced at US$1,059, while the 1 TB model was priced at $1,299. Both models are bundled with a digital license for Half-Life: Alyx: a port of the game was released to run natively on Steam Frame, with optimizations such as foveated rendering support and optimizations to SteamOS's Vulkan drivers.

== Reception ==
The Steam Frame received mixed reviews. Ars Technica described it as being "simultaneously overengineered and underbaked, depending on how you look at it", noting that the headset felt more balanced and less front-heavy than competing standalone headsets due to its design, its controllers were heavily modeled after the Meta Quest Touch Plus controllers, and that streams from PCs were high quality with relatively low latency (albeit impacted by the stability of the Steam Link software at launch). The Frame port of Half-Life: Alyx was described as having "relatively few compromises" over the PC version, but it was noted that "a 'portable' version of a state-of-the-art VR game from over five years ago feels less impactful at a time when big-budget games from 2024 are getting Verified for Steam Deck", the Frame had spotty compatibility with existing SteamVR games when running standalone on SteamOS (with only a "few dozen" listed as verified at launch, and one "verified" game not working at all in testing), and that the performance of its ARM processor limited verified non-VR games to 2D titles and older, less-intensive 3D games (such as Portal 2). It was felt that the Steam Frame would appeal best as an alternative to Meta Quest for power users interested in its versatility, or those avoiding Meta products due to the company's policies and business practices, but that "avoiding Meta's platform lock-in isn’t worth the hundreds of extra dollars Valve is seeking for its unsubsidized VR hardware", and that the company was "a few years late and a few hundred dollars short here."

Engadget similarly noted that the Frame felt "very comfortable", and that the standalone port of Alyx "still feels like a premium VR experience" despite the lower graphical fidelity in comparison to the PC version, but noted the poor quality of its on-board speakers, its limited battery life, and a lack of "killer apps" at launch aside from existing titles. It was argued that the Frame would have made more sense if it were released around the same time as the Meta Quest 3 and at a lower price, but that the global memory supply shortage made this impractical, the Frame "[arrived] far too late to inject much life into the declining state of VR", and that the Quest 3 or a pre-owned Index were a better entry into VR than the Steam Frame.

== See also ==
- List of virtual reality headsets
