= 2025–present global memory supply shortage =

Semiconductor memory supply crisis

- Part of AI boom
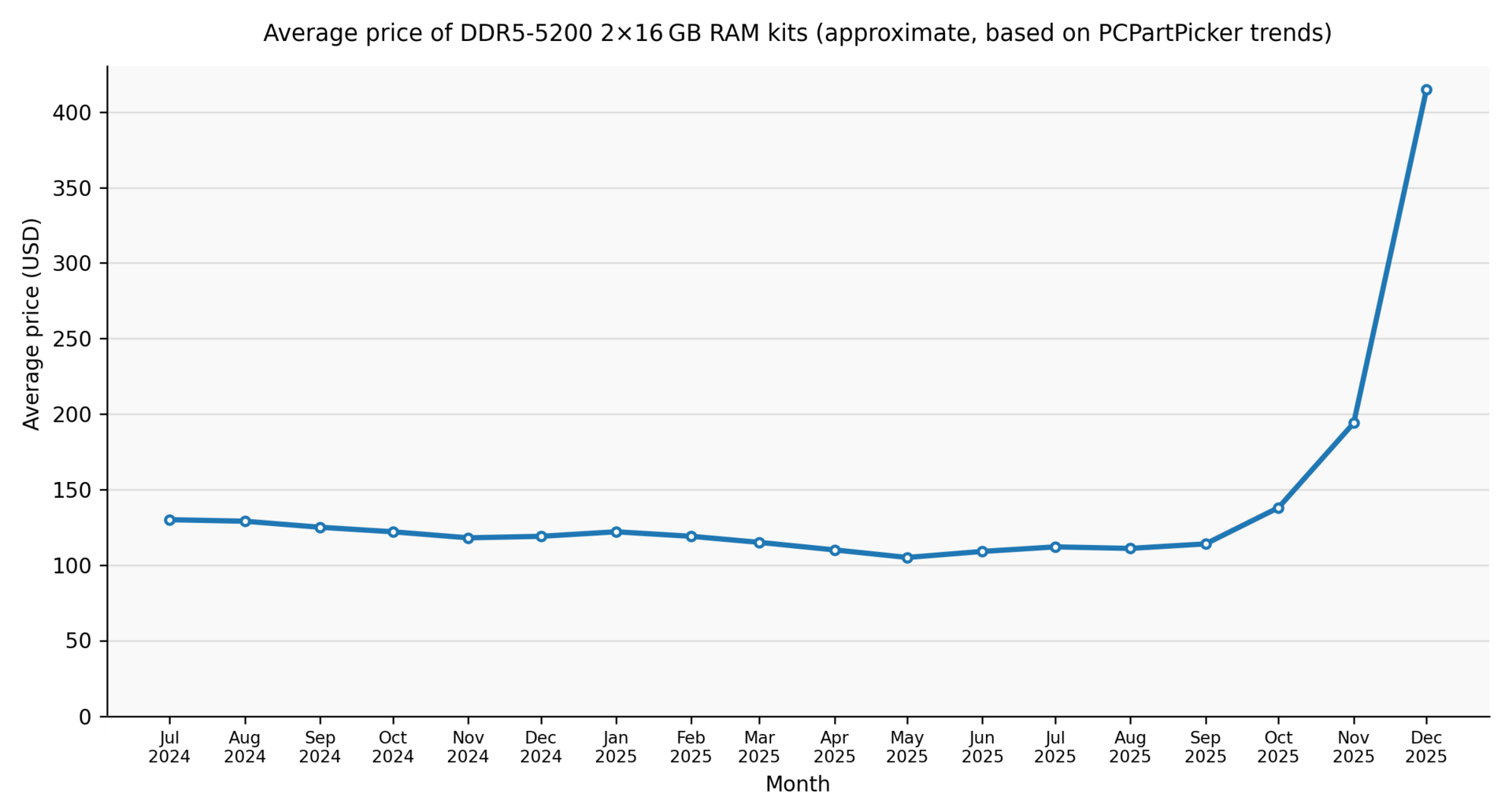
- Average retail price of DDR5-5200 16 GB × 2 RAM kits between July 2024 and December 2025
- Date: September 2025–present
- Location: Global
- Cause: Artificial intelligence infrastructure demand; Increased interest in High Bandwidth Memory technology; Geopolitical trade restrictions; Strategic and intentional manufacturing capacity reallocation by the semiconductor industry
- Outcome: 200–400% price increases in DRAM and NAND flash, OpenAI consumes ~40% of global DRAM supply, 15–20% cost increases for PC OEMs

A global computer memory supply shortage started in 2025 due to supply constraints and rapid price escalation in the semiconductor memory market, particularly affecting DRAM and NAND flash integrated circuits. This shortage has been referred to in media outlets as "RAMmageddon" or the "RAMpocalypse". Unlike the 2020–2023 global chip shortage, which stemmed primarily from pandemic-related supply chain disruptions from COVID-19, this is a demand-side shortage, driven by the AI boom, involving reallocation of manufacturing capacity toward products intended for AI data center development, creating a scarcity of integrated circuits intended for the consumer and enterprise markets.

According to a 2026 Kearney PERLab analysis, the shortage is expected to last at least until 2030. In June 2026, Micron Technology CEO Sanjay Mehrotra expected the shortage to last through 2027, and supply to gradually improve by 2028. In August 2026, Samsung Electronics expects the shortage to continue through 2028, while SK Hynix expects it to persist until 2030.

== Background ==
Price trends of a GeForce RTX 5090 graphics card in Germany between August 2025 and October 2026

Following a severe market downturn during 2022–2023, major memory manufacturers—Samsung Electronics, SK Hynix, and Micron Technology—implemented strategic production cuts to stabilize pricing. By mid-2024, the rapid expansion of generative AI services triggered unprecedented demand for specialized memory products, particularly high bandwidth memory (HBM) used in AI accelerators and data center GPUs. Specialized components of semiconductor technology are also experiencing supply constraints due to high demand in AI applications. For example, glass cloth, a high-performance glass fiber substrate used for power-efficient high speed data transfer and a crucial component of semiconductor manufacturing, is experiencing a supply crisis. Nitto Boseki, a Japanese firm having overwhelming monopoly in its production, is not able to meet increased demands, making chip-makers such as Qualcomm, Apple, Nvidia, and AMD compete for securing supply. There are also reports of smaller electronics companies struggling to find suppliers for components such as NAND flash. Memory suppliers are adapting to increased demands and market unpredictability by requiring prepayment or shorter time-frame of payment, which makes it more difficult for smaller firms to acquire capital to survive. By 2026, due to steadily increased demand on resources, CPUs are also experiencing shortage issues due to low fabrication capacity, prioritization of server CPUs, and increased demand, with CPU prices also being forecast to increase by as much as 15%.

The demand on memory has also increased strain on other electronic components such as hard disk devices, with reports such as Western Digital's hard disk supply for 2026 being booked for enterprise applications before February 2026.

A 2024 McKinsey analysis projected that global demand for AI-ready data center capacity would grow at approximately 33% annually through 2030, with AI workloads consuming roughly 70% of total data center capacity by the decade's end. In addition, according to Kearney's State of Semiconductor 2025 Report, executives were already expecting a shortage in the sub–8 nm feature size with memory chips being mentioned as an acute source of concern. Multiple companies mentioned being prepared for it through long-term agreements with RAM suppliers or amassing additional inventory.

On March 24, 2026, Google announced TurboQuant, a memory compression technology focused on large language models (LLM) and vector search engines, which it claimed achieves 6 times lower memory consumption in tested local LLMs, and 8-fold performance enhancement in tests running on H100 accelerators. The technology is also a drop-in enhancement for existing inference pipeline. Amid speculation about memory demand trends, memory manufacturers, Sandisk, Micron, Western Digital, and Seagate, among other companies involved in memory manufacture experienced stock price declines. Prices of memory kits also declined in the following months, although still at inflated prices.

In August 2026, Intel hinted it was investigating a new memory architecture.

== Development ==
On July 8, 2026, Micron announced it had broken ground on a new $9.3 billion fabrication plant for memory production. It is expected to start production in Q3 2028.

== Causes ==
=== HBM production displacement ===
HBM manufacturing requires significantly more wafer capacity per bit than standard DRAM modules. Industry sources reported that as manufacturers allocated increasing wafer capacity to HBM production to meet contracts with AI infrastructure providers, the supply of conventional DDR4 and DDR5 modules for consumer PCs and smartphones contracted sharply.

By September 2025, Samsung Electronics had reportedly expanded its 1c DRAM capacity to target 60,000 wafers per month specifically for HBM4 production, further diverting resources from consumer memory lines.

=== Geopolitical and trade barriers ===
The supply chain was further constrained by escalating trade tensions between the United States and China. Throughout 2025, fears of U.S. regulatory backlash and new tariff structures led major manufacturers like Samsung and SK Hynix to halt sales of older semiconductor manufacturing equipment to Chinese entities, effectively capping production capacity in the region. Additionally, proposed tariff policies by the U.S. administration in late 2025 prompted supply chain realignments, with Apple reportedly accelerating plans to source all U.S.-bound iPhones from India to avoid potential levies.

=== NAND flash capacity constraints ===
In the NAND flash segment, manufacturers prioritized higher-margin enterprise SSDs for data center applications while phasing out older process nodes more rapidly than anticipated. In November 2025, contract prices for NAND wafers increased by more than 60% month-over-month for certain product categories, with 512 GB TLC experiencing the steepest rise as legacy manufacturing capacity was retired.

== Impact on other industries ==
=== Memory manufacturer responses ===
Samsung is concerned about the possibility of a demand shortfall by 2028. Chey Tae-won, Chairman of SK Group, estimated the memory shortage will last until 2030. In 2026, Kye-hyun Kyung, advisor to Samsung and former head of Samsung's chip group, suggested memory prices could drop within a year, while Adata chairman, Chen Li-bai, claims that the DRAM shortage will last for 10 years, arguing that future AI memory demand was underestimated.

=== PC manufacturers ===
Major PC manufacturers responded to component cost increases with significant price raises and supply chain strategies. Dell Technologies Chief Operating Officer Jeff Clarke stated during a November 2025 analyst call that the company had "never witnessed costs escalating at the current pace", describing tighter availability across DRAM, hard drives, and NAND flash memory.

Analysts at Morgan Stanley downgraded Dell Technologies stock from "Overweight" to "Underweight" in late 2025, citing the company's heavy exposure to rising server memory costs. The firm warned that skyrocketing memory prices could erode margins for server and PC OEMs. Conversely, Apple Inc. was reportedly less affected than its competitors, having secured long-term supply agreements for DRAM through the first quarter of 2026. However, on June 25, 2026, Apple announced price hikes effective immediately on all iPads, Macs, HomePods, Apple Vision Pro, and Apple TV, causing Apple shares to decline by more than 6%, the worst day for the stock since the April 2025 stock market crash.

Lenovo chief financial officer Winston Cheng described the cost surge as "unprecedented" and disclosed that the company's memory inventories were approximately 50% above normal levels in anticipation of further price increases. Meanwhile, Acer CEO Jason Chen said in September 2026 that memory prices will begin to fall in late 2027 as Chinese RAM supply increases, and he claimed supply has met demand and only top-tier products were affected adversely. He accused memory makers of prolonging their shortage projections to increase profit.

=== Consumer electronics sector ===
The shortage particularly affected smartphone manufacturers and other consumer electronics producers. DRAM prices reportedly rose by 172% throughout 2025, leading manufacturers like Samsung to halt new orders for DDR5 modules to reassess pricing structures and Micron to exit its 'Crucial' brand of consumer products.

In Tokyo's Akihabara electronics district, retailers began limiting purchases of memory products to prevent hoarding, with prices for popular DDR5 memory modules more than doubling in some cases. Despite the broad trend of rising hardware costs, some companies engaged in aggressive pricing strategies to maintain market share; for example, Sony reduced the price of the PlayStation 5 by US$100 for Black Friday 2025, potentially absorbing increased component costs to stimulate software ecosystem growth.

Due to memory prices more than doubling in a single quarter, HP revealed in its Q1 2026 earnings call that memory costs accounted for 35% of PC build materials up from 15 to 18% previous quarter. Despite showing strong Q1 2026 earnings driven by Windows 11 upgrade cycle and AI PC adoption, HP warned investors of low operating margins and up to double digit percentage decline for the coming quarter. Trendforce, an IT analytics company, updated its forecast from 1.7% year-over-year growth in PC market to 2.6% year-over-year decline for 2026, amid backdrop of steadily increasing prices and supply crisis. Research and analytics firms, Gartner and IDC, expected the worldwide PC market to decline 10–11%, and the smartphone market to decline 8–9% in 2026. Gartner also projected that rising memory prices would make low-margin entry level laptops under US$500 financially unviable in two years.

Valve's second Steam Machine, originally set to launch in early 2026, was delayed because of the shortage. When it released in June, the company said "our original goal for the price of Steam Machine is no longer viable" and retailed it at US$1,049. Analyst Piers Harding-Rolls noted the price was 75% more than the PlayStation 5 at the time, calling it a "niche offering".

=== AI infrastructure competition ===
Technology companies including Google, Amazon, Microsoft, and Meta Platforms placed open-ended orders with memory suppliers, indicating they would accept as much supply as available regardless of cost, according to Reuters sources.

The limited supply of AI chips has been cited as a reason for the slow down in compute growth.

In October 2025, OpenAI formally announced a strategic partnership using letters of intent with Samsung Electronics and SK Hynix to secure supply for its Stargate Project AI infrastructure. Reports indicated that the Stargate initiative alone would consume up to 40% of global DRAM output, requiring approximately 900,000 wafers per month. The deal involved the supply of undiced wafers rather than packaged chips to streamline logistics for the massive data center build-out.

Nvidia, whose AI processors require substantial amounts of high-bandwidth memory, acknowledged significant price increases but stated it had secured adequate supply. CNBC reported that Nvidia's increasing adoption of LPDDR memory for its AI products added additional pressure to supply chains, as this memory type is also used in premium consumer electronics.

== Legal issues ==
Samsung, SK Hynix, and Micron—the three largest manufacturers of DRAM—were sued in an antitrust class-action lawsuit over potentially taking advantage of the supply shortage by price-fixing. The complaint alleges they conspired to manipulate the commodity DRAM market through price-fixing and artificial supply constraints. Plaintiffs assert that the manufacturers used the transition to HBM as a pretext to simultaneously cut production of conventional DRAM and exit legacy product lines like DDR3.

== See also ==
- 2020–2023 global chip shortage
- High Bandwidth Memory
- Semiconductor industry
- AI boom
- AI bubble
- List of data compression algorithms
- List of DRAM manufacturers
- vLLM – open-source LLM inference engine that uses the PagedAttention algorithm to improve memory efficiency of AI models
