= SteamOS =

Linux distribution made by Valve

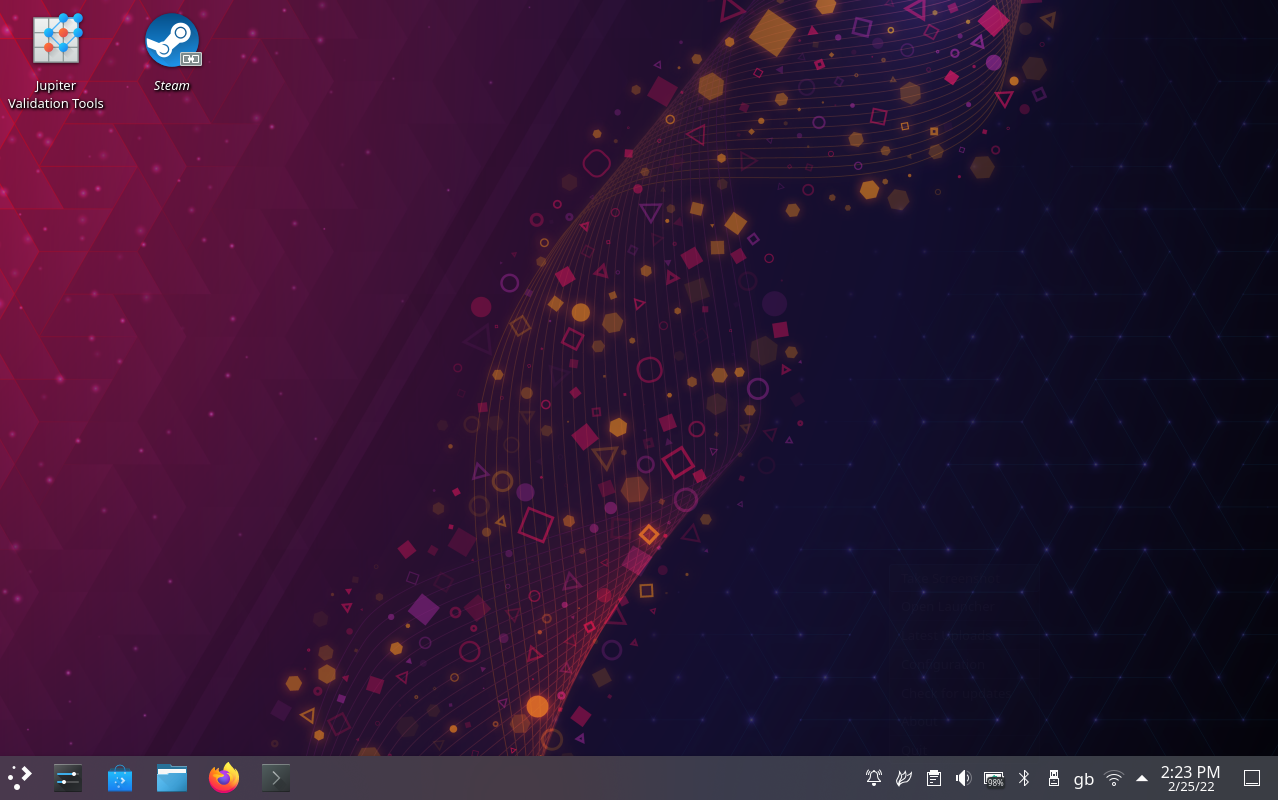
- SteamOS 3.0 "holo" with the KDE Plasma desktop environment running on the Steam Deck
- Developer: Valve
- OS family: Linux
- Working state: Current
- Source model: Open source base system with closed source components
- Initial release: December 13, 2013; 12 years ago
- Latest release: 3.9.5 (October 23, 2026; 15 days ago) [±]
- Latest preview: 3.9.5 Beta (October 23, 2026; 15 days ago) [±]
- Marketing target: Gaming
- Package manager: APT (versions 1.0 and 2.0); Flatpak, Pacman (Note: Works after disabling write-protection on the OS image. Packages installed with pacman may not persist across updates.) (version 3.0)
- Supported platforms: x86-64, ARM64
- Kernel type: Monolithic (Linux)
- Userland: GNU
- Default user interface: Steam (gaming mode); KDE Plasma (desktop mode)
- Official website: store.steampowered.com/steamos

SteamOS is a gaming-focused operating system released by Valve that incorporates the company's video game storefront, Steam. Based on Arch Linux and built specifically to support Steam, it is the default Linux distribution for Valve's line of gaming hardware, including the Steam Deck, Steam Machine, and Steam Frame. Beginning in 2025, Valve expanded official support to include third-party devices designated as "SteamOS Compatible", such as handhelds like the Asus ROG Ally and Lenovo Legion Go. It can also be installed on personal computers without official support from Valve. The core operating system is free and open-source software, while the Steam client remains proprietary.

SteamOS was first released in 2013, with versions 1.0 and 2.0 based on Debian and designed primarily as a client for streaming games over a local network from a gaming PC, with limited support for native gameplay. Valve promoted the platform as part of a broader effort to expand Linux gaming. In 2022, Valve introduced SteamOS 3.0 alongside the launch of the Steam Deck. This version transitioned to an Arch Linux base which uses a rolling release model that Valve felt was better suited for hardware support. It has a dual‑mode interface: a 10-foot user interface powered by Steam's Big Picture UI, and a KDE Plasma desktop environment for traditional computing use. SteamOS 3.0 also incorporates Valve’s Proton compatibility layer, enabling many Windows games to run on Linux.

== History ==
Following the release of Windows 8 in 2012, Valve's executive director Gabe Newell expressed concern on the control that Microsoft has on the personal computer (PC) market. He said "Windows 8 is a catastrophe for everyone in the PC space", fearing that the requirements of the new operating system would push some manufacturers out of the PC market. Additionally, Newell was concerned that the new Microsoft Store feature, which would be the only outlet to acquire new software on versions of Windows 8 on ARM processors, was a threat to Steam and other digital storefronts. Newell said Valve was already looking at tools to keep the PC platform open, which had been the basis for Valve's prior successes.

During a panel at LinuxCon on September 16, 2013, Newell stated that he believed "Linux and open source are the future of gaming", going on to say that the company was aiding game developers who want to make games compatible with Linux, and that they would be making an announcement the following week related to introducing Linux into the living room. On September 20, 2013, Valve posted a statement on its website titled The Steam Universe is Expanding in 2014 which teased three new announcements related to "even more ways to connect the dots for customers who want Steam in the living-room". The first announcement was made on September 23 as SteamOS, with Valve saying they had "come to the conclusion that the environment best suited to delivering value to customers is an operating system built around Steam itself". A large focus of the reveal was the openness of the operating system, with it being announced that users would be able to alter or replace any part of the software, and that it would be free.

In October 2013, Valve announced Steam Dev Days; a two-day developer conference where video game developers could test and provide feedback on SteamOS and prototype Steam Machines. In October 2013, Nvidia also announced their collaboration with Valve to support SteamOS with the help of a development suite called Nvidia GameWorks, incorporating PhysX, OptiX, VisualFX and other Nvidia-proprietary APIs and implementations thereof.

=== Versions 1.0 and 2.0 ===
In November 2013, Valve confirmed that they would not be making any exclusive games for SteamOS, and discouraged other developers from doing so, as it goes against their philosophy of selling games wherever customers are. In December, Valve announced that a beta version of SteamOS would be released on December 13, 2013. When this beta version (dubbed SteamOS 1.0) released, Valve encouraged customers unfamiliar with Linux to wait until 2014, and the release of SteamOS 2.0.

Originally, video content such as television, movies and music were only available on SteamOS through Steam's store, which offered only a small number of films, or locally stored content. In October 2015, an update allowed Netflix and other DRM protected content to function in the native built-in browser. SteamOS 2.0 installations recommended an Intel or AMD 64-bit capable processor, at least 4 gigabytes of RAM, 200 GB on one's hard disk, either an AMD Radeon 8500 or newer or an Nvidia Fermi graphics card (GeForce 400 series and GeForce 500 series) or newer, a USB port and UEFI boot support. A custom installer method was also made available through Valve's repositories, which could require additional configuration steps, allowing for smaller hard-disk sizes and non-UEFI motherboards.

In mid-October 2015, preorders of the Steam Controller, Steam Link, and Alienware branded Steam Machines became available. The official release date for Steam Machines was November 10, 2015. In the following years, reliance by game engines on proprietary Windows APIs, as well as steadily more efficient computer hardware, made SteamOS an obstacle to the success of Steam Machines, which declined in popularity throughout the latter half of the decade relative to platforms such as mobile gaming and handheld consoles.

=== Version 3.0 ===
On July 15, 2021, Valve announced the Steam Deck, a brand-new handheld PC gaming device, which would run a new and substantially different version of SteamOS, version 3.0. This new version is based on Arch Linux, with the KDE Plasma 5 desktop environment pre-installed to allow users to customize their systems. The decision to move from Debian to Arch Linux was based on the different update schedule for these distributions; Debian, geared for server configurations, updates core OS software in one large release, with intermediate patches for known bugs and security fixes, while Arch uses a rolling update approach for all parts. Valve found that using Arch's rolling updates as a base would be better suited for the Steam Deck, allowing them to address issues and fixes much faster than Debian would allow. SteamOS itself is not rolling release. Valve contracted with Collabora to build their updating system. Valve affirmed that SteamOS 3.0 will continue to be freely available, with the intention of allowing other hardware developers to take advantage of it and build similar handheld computing devices like the Deck. Version 3.0 also included Flatpak for application management, controller remapping tools, and support for Vulkan graphics drivers.

With the release of Version 3.0, older versions of SteamOS are no longer supported and are not maintained. Initially, Valve did not release a version of SteamOS 3.0 intended for devices other than the Steam Deck, though community resources exist for installing it onto personal computers without official support. With an August 2024 update, Valve introduced support for mapping to the additional buttons on the Asus ROG Ally. According to Lawrence Yang, a designer at Valve, they are looking to expand support to additional handheld systems. Valve released brand guidelines for SteamOS to be used by other manufacturers to indicate support for the operating system in December 2024. In January 2025, Lenovo released the Legion Go S, which was the first official third-party handheld device that could be operated using SteamOS; Valve released an update to SteamOS in May 2025 to formally support the Legion Go S. Following the release of SteamOS 3.7.8 on May 22, Valve officially enrolled SteamOS for AMD-powered handheld computers. In November 2025, Valve announced the ARM-based Steam Frame VR headset, implying support for ARM devices through an x86 emulation layer known as Fex. On June 17, 2026, SteamOS 3.8.10 released twelve days ahead the Steam Machine's launch and included beta support for AMD and Intel desktop hardware, with plans to include Nvidia hardware support in the future.

== Features ==
SteamOS is designed primarily for playing video games made for PC without need of a traditional computer, such as on a television or a handheld device. It does this by providing a console-like experience, known as "Gaming Mode", which includes quality of life features and a streamlined user interface, on top of an operating system that targets generic PC hardware which can be housed in any form factor. The first versions of SteamOS could run games developed natively for Linux, as well as stream games from Windows, Mac or Linux computers. Version 3.0 utilizes Valve's Proton compatibility layer to run a variety of games originally developed for Windows. While SteamOS supports Linux-native package managers, the primary software distribution method for SteamOS is the Steam storefront also used to distribute games to other operating systems. Some features, such as family sharing and parental restrictions, handled by Steam's desktop client on other operating systems, were moved into SteamOS. Valve claimed that it had "achieved significant performance increases in graphics processing" on the first two versions of SteamOS prior to the maturation of Proton. The operating system is open source, allowing users to build on or adapt the source code, though the actual Steam client is closed.

As SteamOS was intended for playing games without a mouse or keyboard, the first two versions did not have many built-in functions beyond web browsing and playing games. As of Version 3.0, users may freely access the KDE Plasma 5 desktop environment, known as "Desktop Mode", and perform tasks such as installing other software. Version 3.0 still utilizes an immutable file system, with only the user's home directory being writeable, but allows full permissions for solutions such as containerization and chroot for user programs requiring root access. The OS natively supports Nvidia, Intel, and AMD graphics processors. Version 3.0 added full support for peripheral devices, allowing SteamOS devices such as the Deck to be used as conventional PCs.

Version 3.0 is based on Arch Linux, rather than Debian, with some customizations. The OS includes Gamescope, which is a gaming-oriented micro compositor designed to optimize display on the Steam Deck. When the pre-installed Steam client is launched using Gamescope, it constitutes activation of Gaming Mode. Ahead of the Steam Frame release, Valve released two additional compatibility layers used in SteamOS as open-source tools. Fex is a layer that emulates x86 processor instructions on the ARM chipset used in the Steam Frame. It is based on the fex-emu project by Ryan Houdek, whom Valve worked with to create the Fex implementation for SteamOS. The other layer is Lepton, an Android emulator based on Waydroid, allowing Android software packages (SPKs) to run on non-Android operating systems via a software container. This allows most virtual reality titled developed for the Meta Quest to run on Steam Frame, as well as the potential for any Android-based game to be offered through Steam.

== Releases and performance ==
Release	Codename	Base distribution	Date	Notes
1.0	alchemist	Debian 7 (Wheezy)	December 2013	
2.0	brewmaster	Debian 8 (Jessie)	November 2015	Major changes compared to SteamOS 1.0: Various third-party drivers and updated graphics stack; Updated kernel tracking the 4.1 longterm branch; Custom graphics compositor; Auto-update from the Valve SteamOS repositories
3.0	clockwerk	Debian 9 (Stretch)	Unreleased	Under development until 2019, but abandoned in favor of Arch Linux-based holo.
3.0	holo	Arch Linux	March 2022	Includes Proton Windows-compatibility layer, and the KDE Plasma desktop environment for traditional computing use.

=== SteamOS 1.0 ===
In December 2013, Phoronix compared three Nvidia graphics cards on SteamOS 1.0 beta and Windows 8.1 Pro. Overall, Nvidia's proprietary Linux graphics driver delivered performance comparable to that of the Windows drivers due to the platforms’ largely shared codebase.

In January 2014, GameSpot compared the performance of three games (Dota 2, Left 4 Dead 2, and Metro: Last Light) running on Windows 7 x64 and SteamOS 1.0 beta. With an AMD graphics card, they found that all ran at considerably fewer frames per second on SteamOS, and Left 4 Dead 2 stuttered, which they attributed to a device driver problem. With an Nvidia graphics card, they found that Metro: Last Light ran at a slightly higher frame rate and Dota 2 broke even. (Note: GameSpot published contradictory findings regarding Left 4 Dead 2.) With both video card brands, Left 4 Dead 2 and Dota 2 had longer load times on SteamOS.

=== SteamOS 2.0 ===
When Steam Machines were officially released in November 2015, Ars Technica compared the rendering performance of cross-platform games on SteamOS 2 and Windows 10 running on the same machine, using average frame-per-second measurements, and found that games rendered between 21% and 58% slower on SteamOS 2. Ars Technica suggested this might be due to the inexperience of developers optimizing on OpenGL in contrast to DirectX, and believed that the performance might improve with future titles. They noted that their benchmark test, using six games on a single computer, was far from comprehensive.

=== SteamOS 3.0 ===
In March 2022, Linus Tech Tips compared SteamOS 3.0 and Windows 10 performance on the Steam Deck using three gaming benchmarks (including Hitman 3, Doom Eternal, and Elden Ring) showing all three titles having a higher average frames per second on SteamOS compared to Windows 10. Hitman 3 delivered a 19 fps average for Windows 10 and a 34 fps average for SteamOS 3. In Doom Eternal, SteamOS 3 hit a 60 fps average while Windows hit a 47 fps average. Elden Ring on SteamOS topping out at 37 fps average while running on Windows 10 at a 30 fps average. SteamOS Beta for handheld is intended to be released before Lenovo's Legion Go S releases in May 2025.

== Reception ==
=== Pre-release ===
Following SteamOS’ initial announcement, many video game developers expressed enthusiasm. Minecraft creator Markus Persson described it as "amazing news", and Thomas Was Alone developer Mike Bithell called it "encouraging" for indie games. Other developers such as DICE, creators of the Battlefield series, and The Creative Assembly, developers of the Total War series, stated that they may add Linux support for their games following SteamOS’ release.

On the operating system front, Gearbox Software head Randy Pitchford expressed a belief that the operating system needed a unique application to attract developers, saying "without that must-buy product driving us all towards this stuff, I expect that the industry at large will watch curiously, but remain largely unaffected." Richard Stallman, former president of the Free Software Foundation, expressed cautious support, but did not condone the use of non-free games or DRM.

=== SteamOS 1.0 ===
The SteamOS beta release received mixed reviews. In TechRadar's review Henry Winchester praised the easy to navigate interface and future potential but criticized the hard installation and lack of extra features compared to the Steam software. Eurogamer's Thomas Morgan did not experience installation problems, but commented negatively on the lack of options available for detecting monitor resolutions and audio output, in addition to the lack of games available natively on the operating system. However, he responded well to the user interface, calling it "a positive start".

=== SteamOS 2.0 ===
Since then, outlets such as Ars Technica have revisited SteamOS since its initial debut, offering observations on the platform's growth, pros, and cons. Both Falcon Northwest and Origin PC, computer manufacturers that were planning on offering Steam Machine hardware, opted to not ship a SteamOS-enabled machine in 2015 due to limitations of SteamOS over Windows; Falcon Northwest said they would still consider shipping machines with SteamOS in the future if performance improves.

=== SteamOS 3.0 ===
SteamOS 3.0 released alongside Steam Deck as the system's built-in OS, though Valve also stated it would become publicly available for any hardware in the future. It received generally positive reviews.

PCGamer's Wes Fenlon praised SteamOS' ease of use and described it as a "new version of SteamOS up against any of the current consoles for functionality and ease-of-use". He also praised the stability of sleep mode, stating that "it just works". PCMag described SteamOS' default Gaming Mode as "Linux With an Accessible Skin" and "conducive to handheld gaming" and praised the general ease of use, but pointed out compatibility issues when using video game mods with software running under Proton. IGN's Seth G. Macy was more critical of SteamOS; while he praised the flexibility of the OS' "Steam Input" controller support (including features like the system-level gyro control), he noted performance was variable with the rapid updates to the Proton compatibility layer, a poor ability to use alternative digital game storefronts, and SteamOS' general incompatibility with games utilizing kernel-level anti-cheat, such as Destiny 2 and games that use Easy Anti-Cheat.

== See also ==
- Android XR
- visionOS
- Meta Horizon OS
- Bazzite
- Video games and Linux
