= Valve Corporation =

American video game company

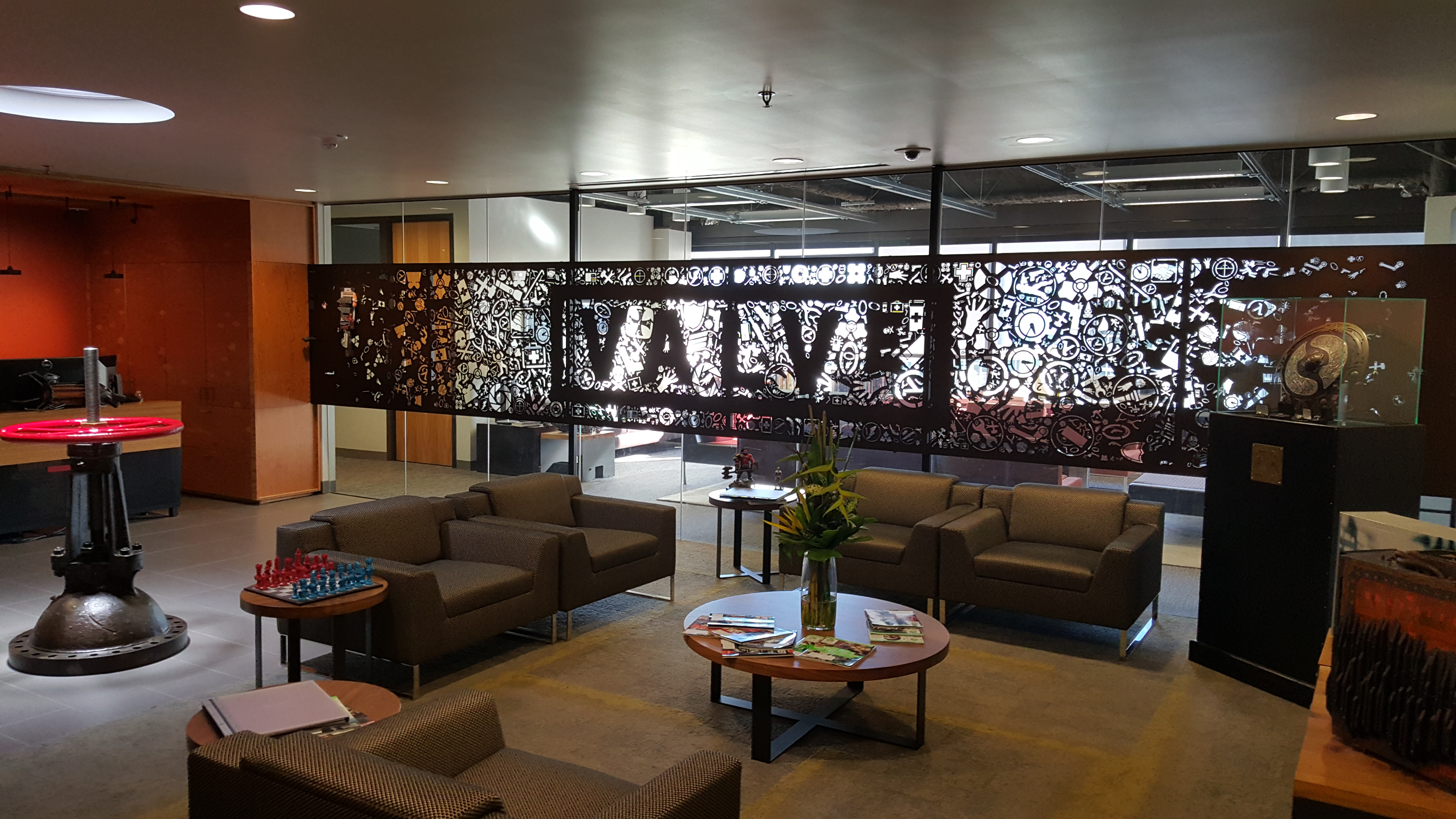
- Former offices in Bellevue, Washington
- Formerly: Valve, L.L.C. (1996–2003)
- Type: Private
- Industry: Video games
- Founded: August 24, 1996; 30 years ago
- Founders: Gabe Newell; Mike Harrington
- Headquarters: Bellevue, Washington, U.S.
- Key people: Gabe Newell (president); Scott Lynch (COO)
- Products: Video games: Counter-Strike; Day of Defeat; Dota; Half-Life; Left 4 Dead; Portal; Team Fortress; Hardware: HTC Vive; Steam Controller (1st gen); Steam Controller (2nd gen); Steam Deck; Steam Frame; Steam Link; Steam Machine; Valve Index; Software: GoldSrc; Proton; Source; Source 2; Source Filmmaker; Steam; SteamOS; Valve Anti-Cheat; VOGL
- Revenue: US$5 billion (2023)
- Total equity: US$6.9 billion (2024)
- Owner: Gabe Newell (>50%)
- Number of employees: 336 (2021)
- Subsidiaries: Valve S.a.r.l.; Valve GmbH; Campo Santo
- ASN: 32590
- Website: valvesoftware.com

Valve Corporation, also known as Valve Software, is an American video game developer, publisher, hardware, and digital distribution company headquartered in Bellevue, Washington. It is the developer of game franchises including Half-Life, Counter-Strike, Portal, Team Fortress, Left 4 Dead and Dota, the software service Steam, and hardware including the Steam Frame, Steam Machine, Steam Deck and Valve Index.

Valve was founded in 1996 by former Microsoft employees Gabe Newell and Mike Harrington. Their debut game, the first-person shooter (FPS) Half-Life (1998), was a critical and commercial success that had a lasting influence on the genre. Harrington left in 2000. In 2003, Valve launched Steam, followed by Half-Life 2 (2004), the episodic sequels Half-Life 2: Episode One (2006) and Episode Two (2007), the puzzle games Portal (2007) and Portal 2 (2011), and the multiplayer games Team Fortress 2 (2007), Left 4 Dead (2008), and Dota 2 (2013).

During the 2010s, Valve released fewer games and focused on hardware and virtual reality (VR). They released the first Steam Machine console in 2015, the Valve Index VR headset in 2019, their flagship VR game, Half-Life: Alyx, in 2020, and the handheld system Steam Deck in 2022. In 2026, Valve released a redesigned Steam Machine and a standalone VR headset, the Steam Frame.

Valve uses a flat organizational structure, allowing employees to choose their own projects. Valve is noted for its technical and artistic innovation, with many of its games receiving mention among the greatest games of all time. They develop games through playtesting and iteration, describing game design as a kind of experimental psychology. By 2012, Valve employed around 250 people and was reportedly worth over US$3 billion. Most of Valve's revenue comes from Steam, which controlled over half of the digital PC games market in 2011 and generated an estimated $3.4 billion in 2017.

== History ==
=== Founding and Half-Life (1996–2003) ===
Newell in 2010

Harrington in 2009

Valve was founded in 1996 by the former Microsoft employees Gabe Newell (left) and Mike Harrington.

Valve was founded in 1996 by the former Microsoft employees Gabe Newell and Mike Harrington. Newell had spent the prior 13 years at Microsoft developing Windows, including the Windows 95 port of Doom from id Software. Newell had become frustrated with game developers' approach of creating bespoke interfaces for graphics acceleration, and had also seen id Software outperforming Windows in sales of Doom with an alternative distribution model.

Newell and Harrington founded Valve, L.L.C. in Kirkland, Washington, about five miles from the Microsoft campus in Redmond, on August 24, 1996, Newell's wedding day. In a break from industry style of the time, Newell did not want a company name that suggested "testosterone-gorged muscles and the 'extreme' of anything". Alternative names considered by Newell and Harrington include Hollow Box, Fruitfly Ensemble and Rhino Scar.

Valve's first game was Half-Life, a first-person shooter (FPS) with elements of horror. The development was aided by access to the Quake engine by id Software; Valve modified this engine into its GoldSrc engine. After struggling to find a publisher, Valve eventually signed with Sierra On-Line.

Half-Life was released in November 1998 and was a critical and commercial success. With its realism, scripted sequences and seamless narrative, it had a lasting influence; according to IGN in 2014, the history of the FPS genre "breaks down pretty cleanly into pre-Half-Life and post-Half-Life eras".

Valve enlisted Gearbox Software to develop three expansions for Half-Life: Opposing Force (1999), Blue Shift (2001) and Decay (2001). In 1998, Valve acquired TF Software, a group that had made the popular Team Fortress mod for Quake, and remade it for GoldSrc as Team Fortress Classic in 1999. Valve released the software development kit (SDK) for the GoldSrc engine, facilitating numerous user-created mods. They acquired the developers of one popular mod, Counter-Strike, to create a standalone Counter-Strike game. Happy with Valve's success, Harrington sold his stake in Valve to Newell in 2000.

Valve's publishing agreement meant Sierra owned the Half-Life intellectual property and held exclusive publishing rights to future Valve games. In 2001, Valve renegotiated by threatening to cease game development and develop other software, using an offer of a partnership from Amazon to create a digital storefront as a bargaining chip. After the agreement with Sierra was amended, Valve gained the Half-Life intellectual property and online distribution rights for its games.

=== Source, Steam, and Half-Life 2 (2003–2010) ===
In 2003, Valve moved to Bellevue, Washington, and reincorporated as Valve Corporation. In 2010, the office moved to a larger location in Bellevue. In 2016, Valve signed a nine-floor lease in the Lincoln Square complex in downtown Bellevue, doubling the size of its offices.

Valve began developing Half-Life 2 six months after the release of the first Half-Life, using its new in-house engine, Source. With advanced physics systems and an increased focus on story and characters, it received critical acclaim upon its release in 2004. By 2011, it had sold 12 million copies.

In 2002, Valve launched Steam, a digital video game distribution platform. Steam initially offered only Valve games, and was mandatory to install Half-Life 2, but it later became a publisher of third-party games. As Valve became its own publisher via Steam, it transitioned to a flat organization. Outside of executive management, Valve does not have bosses and uses an open allocation system, allowing employees to move between departments at will. In July 2005, Electronic Arts announced it would partner with Valve for a multi-year game distribution agreement, following Vivendi Universal's promise to end distribution on August 31.

After having taken five years to develop Half-Life 2, Valve moved to episodic development, planning to release shorter games more frequently. Half-Life 2: Episode One, the first in a planned trilogy of episodic Half-Life 2 sequels, was released in 2006. Episode Two followed in 2007, alongside the multiplayer game Team Fortress 2 and the puzzle game Portal, developed from the student project Narbacular Drop. In February 2007, Valve announced The Black Box and The Orange Box, both bundles of multiple games and expansions, to be distributed by Electronic Arts for Microsoft Windows, PlayStation 3 and Xbox 360. In January 2008, Valve announced the acquisition of Turtle Rock Studios, which was renamed Valve South. Turtle Rock developed Left 4 Dead and Left 4 Dead 2 while associated with Valve. Turtle Rock Studios spun out of Valve again in March 2010. Forbes estimated that Valve had grossed $70 million in 2005.

=== Transition to services (2010–2014) ===
Logo until 2018

In 2009, Valve hired IceFrog, the developer of Defense of the Ancients, a Warcraft III mod. IceFrog led the development of a sequel not associated with the Warcraft elements, Dota 2, released in 2013. Alongside Dota 2 in 2011, Valve started the International, an annual esports tournament for Dota 2 with a prize pool supported by Valve and funds from microtransactions from battle passes purchased by players. Valve released Portal 2 in April 2011. As with the original Portal, Valve employed a Digipen student team to help develop it; the team behind Tag: The Power of Paint implemented the new gel gameplay. In April 2010, Valve launched Steam for Mac OS X along with ports of several of its games including the Half-Life series.

The Screen Digest analyst Ed Barton estimated Valve's 2010 revenue to be in the "high hundreds of millions of dollars". As of 2011, Valve had an estimated worth of $2 to 4 billion and employed 250 people; according to Newell, this made it more profitable per employee than Google or Apple. Most of Valve's revenue came from Steam, which controlled 50 to 70% of the market for downloaded PC games in 2011.

By 2011, Valve had replaced episodic development with a platform-oriented approach, whereby games such as Left 4 Dead 2 and Team Fortress 2 were continually updated through Steam updates. In June 2012, Valve hired the economist Yanis Varoufakis to study the online economies of their games. That December, Valve acquired Star Filled Studios, a two-person studio, to open a San Francisco office. Valve closed the office in August 2013 when it decided it had little benefit. At the 2013 D.I.C.E. Summit, Newell announced that he and the film director J. J. Abrams were collaborating to produce a Half-Life or Portal film, as well as a possible game.

In the 2010s, Valve released fewer games and invested in hardware development. Newell intended to make Valve more like Nintendo, which develops games in tandem with hardware, allowing it to create innovative games such as Super Mario 64. Valve initially focused on augmented reality, but in 2013 Newell laid off many staff to focus on virtual reality (VR). Valve began porting its games to Linux in 2013, including Half-Life 2 and Left 4 Dead 2. In 2015, Valve released the Steam Machine, a line of gaming computers, which sold poorly. Media commentators speculated that Valve's transition to service provider with Steam, which generated an estimated $3.4 billion in 2017, had driven it away from game development.

Valve canceled games including numerous Half-Life projects (including Episode Three), Left 4 Dead 3, a Soulslike game, and a voxel-based game, A.R.T.I. Additional VR projects included SimTrek, developed by members of the Kerbal Space Program development team, and a new VR device, Vader, that was determined to be too costly for consumers. According to the designer Robin Walker, the abundance of projects that failed to gain traction, with no shared vision, damaged morale. Many players grew frustrated in anticipation of a new Half-Life game.

=== Source 2, virtual reality and Half-Life: Alyx (2015–present) ===
Valve announced the Source 2 engine in March 2015, and ported Dota 2 to Source 2 in September. That year, Valve collaborated with the electronics company HTC to develop the HTC Vive, a VR headset released in 2016. Valve experimented with VR games, and in 2016 released The Lab, a collection of VR minigames.

Valve recognized that many players wanted a more ambitious VR AAA game, and began exploring the development of a major VR game. They developed several prototypes, with three further VR projects under development by 2017. Finding that the portal systems of its puzzle series Portal were disorienting in VR, it settled on Half-Life. Walker said that Half-Life 3 had been a "terrifyingly daunting prospect", and the team saw VR as a way to return to the series.

Full development of a VR Half-Life game started around late 2016, with the largest team in Valve's history. Valve acquired the 3D audio software developer Impulsonic in January 2017. In April 2018, Valve acquired the independent developer Campo Santo, known for the 2016 adventure game Firewatch. Campo Santo planned to develop its own games under Valve, though it initially helped develop Half-Life: Alyx.

In November 2018, Valve released Artifact, a digital collectible card game based on Dota 2, with design by Richard Garfield, the creator of Magic: The Gathering. Artifact had unusual pay-for mechanics to acquire new cards, and did not draw a large playerbase, losing 95% of players months after release. In April 2021, Valve abandoned efforts to reboot the project, saying it had not found enough interested players to justify development. In June 2019, Valve released its second-generation VR hardware, the Valve Index. They also released Dota Underlords into early access, an auto battler based on a Dota 2 community-created mode Dota Auto Chess.

In March 2020, Valve released Half-Life: Alyx, a VR game. It received acclaim and was described as VR's first killer app. Newell said in January 2021 that the success of Alyx created desire within the company to develop more games, and that several were under development. Valve collaborated with Netflix for Dota: Dragon's Blood, an animated television series based on Dota, which premiered in March 2021. In February 2022, Valve released the Steam Deck, a portable game system that runs on Linux-based SteamOS with the Proton compatibility layer that allows most Windows games on Steam to run on Linux without modification. In September 2023, Valve released Counter-Strike 2. It received generally favorable reviews, but player reception was mixed.

According to a report by Forbes Australia, Valve had an annual revenue of $5 billion by 2023, with a 40% profit margin. Steam accounted for around 60% of this revenue, double that of 2019. In 2024, Valve began beta-testing a new multiplayer game, Deadlock, a combination of a hero shooter and MOBA. In September, staff from Hopoo Games, the developers of Risk of Rain, announced that they had been employed at Valve.

In November 2025, Valve announced a redesigned Steam Controller and Steam Machine and a new VR headset, Steam Frame. They were scheduled for release in early 2026, but were delayed by the RAM crisis. The second-generation Steam Controller was released on May 4. In June 2026, Valve released the Steam Machine, its first dedicated living room gaming PC since the original Steam Machines introduced in 2015. Valve launched it with a randomized reservation system because of limited production caused by global memory and storage shortages, with prices starting at $1,049 for the base model.

In September 2026, around 12TB of data was extracted from Steam, including complete games, beta versions and prototypes dating between 2003 and 2013, from both Valve and other third-party developers. The anonymous person that disseminated the data claimed it was available without protection from older Steam servers used during that period, which Valve had since transitioned from.

== Structure ==
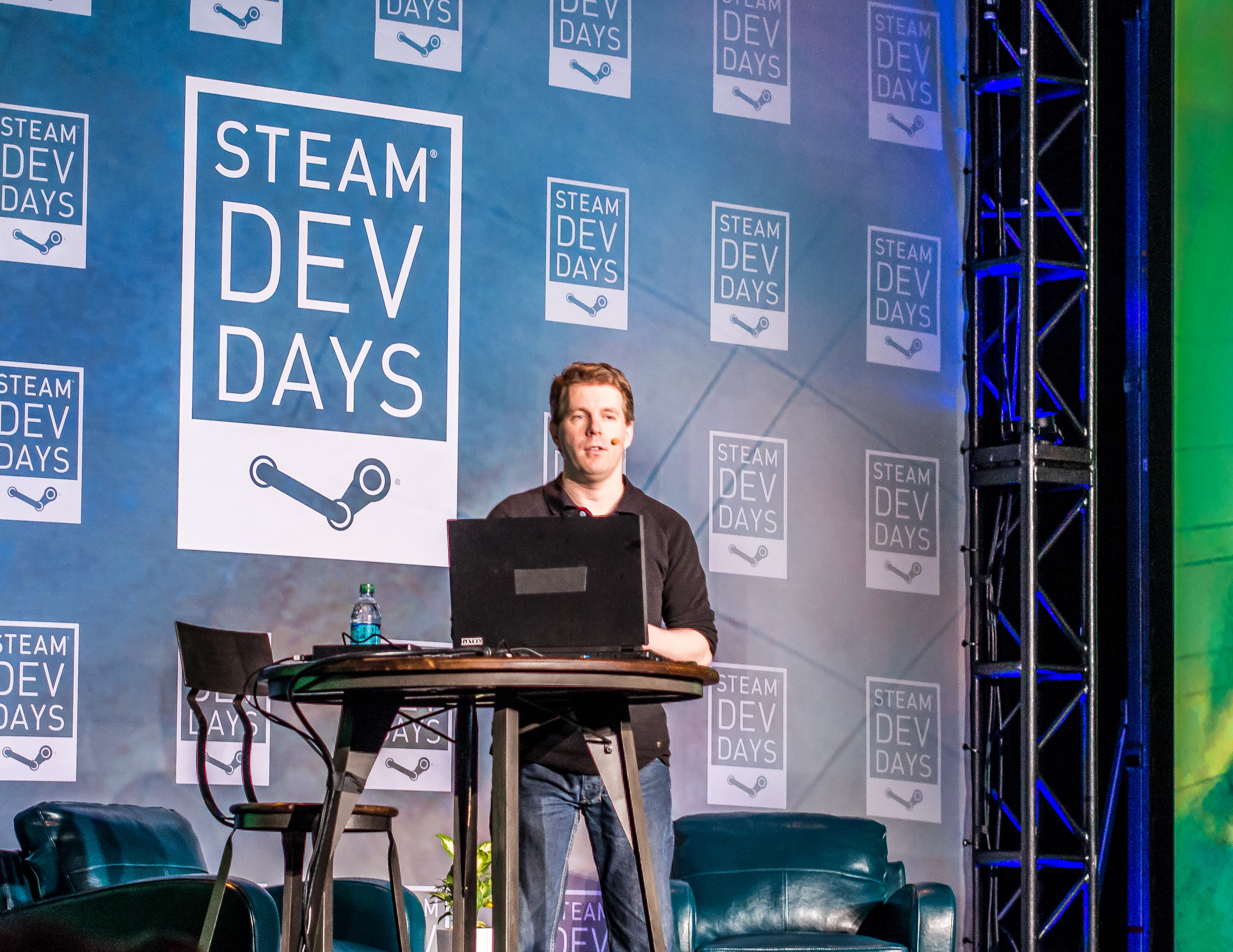
Designer Robin Walker at Steam Dev Days 2014

Initially, Valve used a hierarchical structure typical of other development firms, driven by the nature of physical game releases through publishers that required tasks to be completed by deadlines. However, as Valve became its own publisher via Steam, it found the hierarchical structure was hindering progress.

After completing Half-Life 2, Valve transitioned to a flat organization. Outside of executive management, Valve does not have bosses, and uses an open allocation system. Valve's marketing manager, Doug Lombardi, said: "Nobody writes a design doc and hands it to somebody and says, 'you go build this'. It's the teams that are coming up with the ideas and pushing in the directions that they want to take the product." This approach allows employees to work on whatever interests them, but requires them to take ownership of their product and mistakes they may make, according to Newell. Newell recognized that this structure works well for some but that "there are plenty of great developers for whom this is a terrible place to work". Following the difficult development of Half-Life 2, Newell said he became "obsessed" with improving Valve's work-life balance.

Although Valve has no bosses, some employees hold more influence due to seniority or relationships. De facto project leads became "centralized conduits" for organization and sharing information, and decisions are made collectively. Valve uses a process named Overwatch to gather feedback from senior members, which teams may use or ignore.

The success of Steam means that Valve is not dependent on the success of its games. The lack of organization structure has led to project cancellations, as it can be difficult to convince other employees to work on them. In 2020, Valve acknowledged that this made it difficult to gather momentum and had slowed its output during the 2010s. Its VR projects and Half-Life: Alyx became a turning point, setting short-term studio-wide goals to focus the company. According to Walker, "We sort of had to collectively admit we were wrong on the premise that you will be happiest if you work on something you personally want to work on the most."

In January 2023, People Make Games released a report on Valve's corporate structure and culture, based on interviews with several current and former employees. They found that Valve's flat structure and stack-ranking compensation system created a poor release record and a lack of employee diversity. In 2024, Forbes estimated that Newell owned 50.1% of Valve, with the rest owned by employees.

As part of Wolfire Games' lawsuit over Steam policies, case documents revealed details related to Valve's employee structure. Valve had 60 employees in 2003 and had approximately 350 employees between 2012 and 2021. Employees are categorized into administration, game development, Steam development and (from 2011) hardware development.

=== Valve time ===
Valve time is an industry term used jokingly with game releases from Valve, used to acknowledge the difference between the "promised" date for released content stated by Valve and to the "actual" release date; "Valve Time" includes delays but also includes some content that was released earlier than expected. Valve has acknowledged the term, including tracking known discrepancies between ideal and actual releases on its public development wiki and using it in announcements about such delays. Valve ascribes delays to its mentality of team-driven initiatives over corporate deadlines.

=== Playtesting ===
Valve playtests its games extensively from the beginning of development, and iterates based on the results. It believes that "all game designers are, in a sense, experimental psychologists". The Valve writer Chet Faliszek said he initially blamed testers when they failed to engage with designs as expected, but changed his mind when multiple testers had the same problem: "By the third or fourth time, all of a sudden you're realizing, 'I'm an idiot. This is pretty obvious this doesn't work. It's not their fault, it's our fault.'" He gave an example from the development of Left 4 Dead, wherein a texture change caused every tester to miss a ladder and become stuck.

Walker said playtesting helped Valve maximize the experience for players. For example, when something exciting occurs by chance during a playtest, the developers attempt to have it occur for every player. Newell contrasted this approach to that of Warren Spector, whose open-ended games are designed to be replayed with different outcomes: "You spend all of this time to build stuff that most players will never ever ever see. ... If only one per cent of your customers see this cool thing that takes five per cent of your development budget, that's not a good use of resources."

== Products ==
=== Games ===
Valve is the main developer and publisher of the single-player Half-Life and Portal games and the multiplayer games Counter-Strike, Team Fortress 2, Dota 2, Day of Defeat, and Artifact. Valve also published the multiplayer game Left 4 Dead and developed and published Left 4 Dead 2. Unreleased and canceled Valve games include the fantasy role-playing game Prospero and numerous Half-Life projects, including Episode Three. Valve worked with Arkane Studios on The Crossing, which was canceled in May 2009.

Valve video games are noted for their technical and artistic innovation, with virtually every mainline release from the studio receiving mention among the greatest video games of all time.

=== Engines ===
Valve has developed at least three game engines that have been used in its games. GoldSrc is based on a modified Quake engine by id Software, and used for the basis of Half-Life. Source was internally built from scratch as a replacement for GoldSrc, and was used for most of Valve's games in the early 2000s, including Half-Life 2, Team Fortress 2, and the Portal series. Source 2 is a refinement of the Source engine initially released in 2015, and has been used for Dota 2, CounterStrike 2, The Lab, and Half-Life: Alyx.

=== Steam ===
Valve announced Steam, its digital distribution service, at the 2002 Game Developers Conference. It was launched in September 2003 and was first used to deliver patches and other updates to Valve's online games.

On August 1, 2012, Valve announced revisions to the Steam Subscriber Agreement (SSA) to prohibit class action lawsuits by users against the service provider. Alongside these changes to the SSA, the company also declared the incorporation of Valve S.a.r.l., a subsidiary based in Luxembourg. Valve set up a physical office in Kirchberg, Luxembourg. According to Valve's project manager Mike Dunkle, the location was chosen for eCommerce capabilities and infrastructure, talent acquisition, tax advantages and central geographic location – most major partners are accessible, 50% within driving distance.

Valve S.a.r.l. was used to sell games to UK users to avoid paying the full 20% value-added tax (VAT). The tax loophole was expected to close on January 1, 2015. In December 2015, the French consumer group UFC Que Choisir initiated a lawsuit against Valve for several of its Steam policies that conflict or run afoul of French law. One of the reasons was for using the tax loophole. Valve S.a.r.l. ceased business on January 1, 2017, with the main company taking over EU sales again.

By July 2014, there were over 3,400 games available on Steam, with over 150 million registered accounts by January 2018. In August 2017, Valve announced that Steam had reached over 67 million monthly and 33 million daily active users on the platform.

=== Steam Machine ===
Newell has been critical of the direction that Microsoft has taken with making Windows a closed architecture similar to Apple's products, and has stated that he believes that the changes made in Windows 8 are "a catastrophe for everyone in the [personal computer] space". Newell identified the open-source Linux platform as an ideal platform for Steam and said the only thing holding back its adoption is the lack of games.

In 2012, Valve announced that they were working on a console-PC hybrid for the living room, dubbed by media as the "Steam Box". A precursor to such a unit is SteamOS, a freely available Linux-based operating system that builds upon the Steam client functionality that includes media services, live streaming across home networks, game sharing within families, and parental controls. SteamOS was officially announced in September 2013 as the first of several announcements related to the Steam Machine platform as well as its unique game controller. In May 2014, Valve announced that the company's own SteamOS-powered Steam Machine would be delayed until 2015 due to problems with the game controller. In 2015, Alienware, ZOTAC, and CyberPowerPC launched its versions of the Steam Machine. By June 2016, fewer than half a million had been sold. While the Steam Machine line has been effectively canceled, Valve continued to manufacture and sell Steam Controllers until late November 2019, and publishes both mobile apps and software for the Steam Link, allowing in-home streaming.

=== Steam Controller ===
Valve has released two versions of a game controller aimed to be used for Steam games, the Steam Controller. The first model was released in November 2015, alongside the original Steam Machine concept, while the second was released in May 2026 ahead of Valve's dedciated Steam Machine model and Steam Frame. Among other features, both generations of the controller use two small trackpads with haptic feedback which can be used either as traditional controller actions like a joystick, but also like a computer mouse input to control many personal computer games that lack traditional controller support.

=== Valve Index and virtual reality ===
At the Game Developers Conference in March 2015, Valve and Taiwanese electronics company HTC unveiled SteamVR and the HTC Vive—a virtual reality platform and a virtual reality headset. The platform would be distinguished by its "Lighthouse" motion tracking system, where sensors on the headset and its included motion controllers read the position of two base station devices mounted in the play area. This would allow for "room-scale" VR experiences, where the player would not be required to remain in a stationary position in front of a camera and would be able to freely walk around the space.

In November 2017, Microsoft added beta support for the SteamVR service for Windows Mixed Reality headsets. In June 2019, Valve released its own VR headset, known as the Valve Index, positioned as a higher-end device with wider field of view and higher refresh rate. They were accompanied by updated motion controllers, which are strapped against the user's palms and have sensors to detect input pressure and individual fingers. In November 2025, Valve announced the Steam Frame, a standalone VR headset.

=== Steam Deck ===
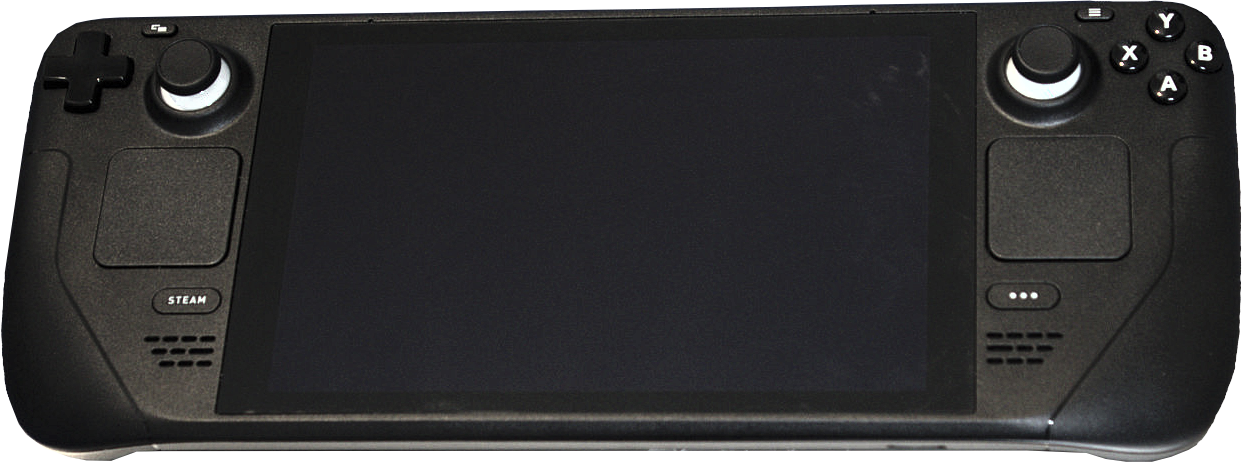
Front of a Steam Deck

Announced in July 2021, the Steam Deck is a hybrid game console similar to the Nintendo Switch. It is primarily a handheld device that supports playing of Steam games, but through a separate dock unit, the console can output to an external monitor and use external power, networking, and USB accessories connected to the dock. The hardware is based on customized AMD Zen 2 and RDNA 2 chipsets. Units started shipping in February 2022. An OLED version of the Steam Deck was released in November 2023; besides the improved display, the OLED modeling includes increased battery life, improved audio, and more storage compared to the original model.

=== Other projects ===
==== PowerPlay ====
PowerPlay was a technological initiative headed by Valve and Cisco Systems to decrease the latency for online games, announced in January 2000. It was described as a set of protocols and deployment standards at the router level to improve performance. It was claimed that a player with 1000 ms ping was able to play against another player on a LAN connection with no noticeable disadvantage. Initially the protocol was to be released with PowerPlay 1.0 focusing on quality of service (QoS) and later a revision, PowerPlay 2.0 that would focus on functionality. Cisco and Valve intended to deliver a single dial-up service in Q1 2000 in the United States with a 30-day free trial with a bundled copy of Team Fortress modified to support PowerPlay.

The standard was to involve purchasing PowerPlay approved Cisco hardware and infrastructure that had adequate bandwidth and QoS standards that prioritize PowerPlay gaming packets at all others' expense. Newell conceded that Internet service providers (ISPs) would bear the brunt of this expense: "The ISPs are going to need to spend a fair amount of money to be compliant with PowerPlay. But how they get that back is up to them. Some will have a tiered service, and some will just try to recoup their investment through reduced customer churn and customer acquisition." Despite never deploying the dial-up plan featuring PowerPlay 1.0, Valve announced in January 2001 that the standard had indeed been finalized. 12 months after its announcement, PowerPlay was abandoned.

==== Pipeline ====
In July 2013, Valve announced Pipeline, an intern project consisting of ten high school students working together to learn how to create video game content. Pipeline serves to discuss and answer questions that teenagers often ask about the video game industry, and see if it is possible to train a group of teenagers with minimal work experience to work for a company like Valve. The latter purpose breaks Valve's tradition of employing experienced developers, as the company is not good at "teaching people straight out of school".

== Legal disputes ==
=== Valve Corporation v. Vivendi Universal Games ===
Between 2002 and 2005, Valve was involved in a complex legal dispute with its publisher, Vivendi Universal Games (under Vivendi's brand Sierra Entertainment). Valve had entered into a publishing agreement with Sierra to release Half-Life and subsequent games in 1997, with the contract giving Sierra some intellectual property (IP) rights to Valve's games. After Valve began development of Half-Life 2, it agreed a new contract with Sierra in 2001, removing these rights from Sierra and giving Valve some rights for digital distribution. Internally, Valve started work on Steam as a means to digitally distribute these games, and first revealed this project at the March 2002 Game Developers Conference.

By August 2002, Valve had found that Sierra was distributing copies of their games to Internet cafes against the terms of their contracts and filed a lawsuit against Sierra and Vivendi. In addition to claims of copyright infringement, Valve asserted that Sierra breached contract by withholding royalties and delaying the release of Counter-Strike: Condition Zero until after the holiday season. Vivendi and Sierra countersued, stating that Valve had misrepresented their position in the revised 2001 contract since they had been working on Steam at that point as a means to circumvent the publishing agreement. Vivendi sought intellectual property rights to Half-Life and a ruling preventing Valve from using Steam to distribute Half-Life 2. The countersuits, if successful, likely would have bankrupted Valve, according to COO Scott Lynch. As part of the discovery phase, Valve received a number of documents in Korean, which a new intern at Valve was able to translate, purporting that Vivendi had directed the destruction of evidence for the case. When shown to the court, the judge took action to block Vivendi's countersuits, turning the case in Valve's direction.

On November 29, 2004, Judge Thomas Samuel Zilly of the U.S. District Court for the Western District of Washington ruled in favor of Valve. The ruling stated that Vivendi Universal and its affiliates (including Sierra) were not authorized to distribute Valve games, either directly or indirectly, through cyber cafés to end users for pay-to-play activities pursuant to the parties' publishing agreement. In addition, Judge Zilly ruled that Valve could recover copyright damages for infringements without regard to the publishing agreement's limitation of liability clause. Valve posted on the Steam website that the companies had come to a settlement in court on April 29, 2005. As a result of the trial, the arbitrator also awarded Valve $2,391,932.

=== Valve Corporation v. Activision Blizzard ===
In April 2009, Valve sued Activision Blizzard, which acquired Sierra Entertainment after a merger with its parent company, Vivendi Universal Games. Activision had allegedly refused to honor the Valve v. Vivendi arbitration agreement. Activision had only paid Valve $1,967,796 of the $2,391,932 award, refusing to pay the remaining $424,136, claiming it had overpaid that sum in the past years.

=== Dota intellectual property ownership ===
Defense of the Ancients (DotA) was a landmark mod first released in 2003 that created the basis of the genre of multiplayer online battle arena (MOBA). It was originally developed by Kyle Sommer (who goes by the alias Eul) within Blizzard Entertainment's Warcraft III: Reign of Chaos via its world editor, and spawned several similar efforts, notably DotA-Allstars. While there had been several that contributed to DotA-Allstars, the project was managed primarily by Steve "Guinsoo" Feak, and later by "IceFrog". IceFrog was eventually hired by Valve in 2009, with the rights to the DotA intellectual property being sold to Valve the following year. Eul was also hired into Valve by 2010. Valve then subsequently filed trademarks towards a sequel to DotA, titled Dota 2. DotA-Allstars, LLC, a group of former contributors to the DotA-Allstars project, filed an opposing trademark in August 2010 to contest Valve's claim it owned the property rights.

DotA-Allstars, LLC was eventually acquired by Blizzard to start development of Blizzard All-Stars. Blizzard took over the trademark challenge. The United States Patent & Trademark Office initially ruled in Valve's favor. By this point, Riot Games had hired Guinsoo to help develop its own MOBA, League of Legends. Feak transferred his rights to the Dota property to Riot, who in turn sold those to Blizzard. Blizzard filed a lawsuit against Valve to challenge Valve's ownership, pitting the rights assigned by Guinsoo at odds to those assigned to Valve by IceFrog and Eul. The case Blizzard Entertainment v. Valve Corporation was settled out of court in May 2012; Valve retained the right to use Dota commercially, while Blizzard reserved the right for fans to use Dota non-commercially. Blizzard changed the names of its own projects to remove the Dota term, and renamed Blizzard All-Stars as Heroes of the Storm. Valve's Dota 2 was released in 2013.

In 2014, mobile developers Lilith and uCool released its games Dota Legends and Heroes Charge, respectively. Both were influenced by Dota and the sequels. In 2017, Valve and Blizzard took joint action against these companies, citing copyright issues related to the Dota names. uCool argued that the Dota games were a collective work and could not be copyrighted by anyone in particular, but the presiding judge, Charles R. Breyer, felt that, due to the trio's actions as maintainers of the Dota mods, they had a rightful copyright claim to this. Separately, Lilith and uCool argued that Eul had, in a forum post from September 2004, assigned an open-source copyright license to Dota, which would make Valve and Blizzard's copyright claims void. The case was later heard by a jury.

=== ACCC v. Valve Corporation ===
The Australian Competition & Consumer Commission (ACCC) announced it was taking action against Valve in 2014. On March 29, 2016, Valve was found guilty of breaching Australian consumer law because:

- Valve claimed consumers were not entitled to a refund for digitally downloaded games purchased from Valve via the Steam website or Steam Client (in any circumstances);
- Valve had excluded statutory guarantees or warranties that goods would be of acceptable quality; and
- Valve had restricted or modified statutory guarantees or warranties of acceptable quality.

During the prosecution of this case, Valve implemented a refund policy for Steam purchases, but the case still reviewed Valve's actions prior to the onset of the lawsuit. The court overseeing the case sided with the ACCC in assigning a A$3 million (about US$2.1 million) fine against Valve in December 2016, as well as requiring Valve to inform Australian consumers of their rights when purchasing games from Steam. Valve appealed the court's determination that it "engaged in misleading or deceptive conduct and made false or misleading representations about consumer guarantees", as well as seeking to appeal the fine, but the Australian higher courts rejected the appeals in December 2017. In January 2018, Valve filed for a "special leave" of the court's decision, appealing to the High Court of Australia. The High Court dismissed this claim in April 2018, asserting that Valve still was liable under Australian law since it sold products directly to its citizens.

=== UFC Que Choisir v. Valve Corporation ===
Consumer rights group UFC Que Choisir, based in France, filed a lawsuit against Valve in December 2015, claiming users should be able to resell their software. The High Court of Paris ruled in favor of UFC Que Choisir in September 2019, stating that Valve must allow the resale of Steam games. Valve stated it will appeal the decision.

In 2022, the Court of Appeal of Paris overturned the lower court's decision, ruling in Valve's favour. In 2024, The French Supreme Court later confirmed this ruling, citing the EU Copyright and Information Society Directive 2001.

=== Skins gambling ===
Valve was named as a defendant in two lawsuits in June and July 2016 related to third-party gambling sites that use the Steamworks API to allow betting with the virtual currency of cosmetic weapon replacement textures, better known as "skins", from Counter-Strike: Global Offensive, which through these sites can be converted from or to real-world money. Both suits assert Valve aiding in underaged gambling. Valve subsequently stated it has no commercial ties with these sites, and that it would demand these sites cease their use of the Steamworks API as they violate the authorized use policies. In October 2016, the Washington State Gambling Commission required Valve to stop the use of virtual skins for gambling on Steam, stating they would face legal repercussions if they failed to co-operate. On October 17, 2016, Valve sent a letter to the Washington State Gambling Commission stating that it had "no business relationship with such gambling sites", asserting that they come into existence, operate, and go out of existence without its knowledge and consent, adding that it was not aware of any such law that Steam or any of its games were violating.

=== Anti-competitive practices ===
In February 2017, the European Commission began investigating Valve and five other publishers—Bandai Namco Entertainment, Capcom, Focus Home Interactive, Koch Media and ZeniMax Media—for anti-competitive practices, specifically the use of geo-blocking through the Steam storefront and Steam product keys to prevent access to software to citizens of certain countries. Such practices would be against the Digital Single Market initiative by the European Union. While the other five companies named are in stages of settling with the EU as of August 2019, Valve has stated it plans to fight the charges, asserting that geo-blocking affects less than 3% of its games, and that it had turned off such geo-blocking within the EU in 2015.

In January 2021, five gamers filed a proposed class-action antitrust lawsuit in California against Valve, alleging that the company "abuses the Steam platform's market power" by requiring game developers and publishers to enter into a "most favored nation" agreement with Valve, restricting their ability to sell games for less on other platforms and thereby preventing price competition. This suit was later consolidated with the Wolfire Games lawsuit.

In May 2021, Wolfire Games filed a proposed class-action antitrust lawsuit against Valve, alleging that the company exerts monopoly power over the PC gaming market and uses its "gatekeeper role" to "wield extreme power over publishers of PC Desktop Games" and to extract "an extraordinarily high cut from nearly every sale that passes through its store." Although a motion by Valve to dismiss the original lawsuit was granted in November 2021, Wolfire was allowed to file a revised complaint, and in May 2022 US District Court Judge John C. Coughenour ruled that that lawsuit could proceed, finding that Wolfire's allegations were "sufficient to plausibly allege unlawful conduct." In November 2024, it was affirmed into a class-action lawsuit, with any developer affected by Valve's revenue cut able to be part of the class.

In June 2024, Vicki Shotbolt, a children's digital rights activist, filed a lawsuit with the Competition Appeal Tribunal in the UK that accuses Valve of "rigging the market" for PC games, alleging that Valve used its market dominance to overcharge 14 million people in the UK and seeking damages of £22 to £44 per affected customer, or £656 million in total.

=== Valve Corporation v. Zaiger, LLC ===
In 2023, Valve sued a law firm, Zaiger, alleging that it attempted to extort settlements from Valve by threatening to bring numerous antitrust arbitration cases on behalf of Steam customers, a tactic referred to as "mass arbitration". Valve also brought suit against a litigation financier for Zaiger over the funding of a social media campaign to recruit Steam users as clients. Valve alleged that it improperly interfered with its contracts with Steam customers and abused the arbitration process by signing up clients with the intent of obtaining settlements slightly lower than the cost of arbitration filing fees, rather than arbitrating their claims. Valve said that it was targeted due to the terms of the Steam Subscriber Agreement, in which Valve would be responsible for the fees and costs associated with arbitration. The lawsuit was dismissed without prejudice by the US District Court for the Western District of Washington in 2024 due to personal jurisdiction issues. In September 2024, Valve changed its Steam Subscriber Agreement to require disputes to proceed in court, specifically in King County, Washington, with no option of arbitration.

=== Valve Corporation v. Rothschild ===
In 2015, Display Technologies LLC, one of several IP-holding companies owned by Leigh Rothschild, sued Valve over patent infringement. While the suit was dismissed by January 2016, Valve shortly followed by acquiring licenses to twenty patents owned across Rothschild's firms.

Around 2022, another Rothschild company, Patent Asset Management, began sending Valve demands to buy new licenses to two of the patents Valve already had licensed. Valve filed a lawsuit against the company in 2023 under Washington state's Patent Troll Protection and Consumer Protection Acts. In the months that followed, at least three lawsuits were filed in Texas by Rothschild's companies against Valve accusing Valve of additional patent infringement. Valve argued these suits were retaliatory to their Washington suit, and requested them to be dismissed. In February 2026, a jury found in Valve's favor on all counts.
