= Steam Link =

Hardware and software product by Valve

- Developer: Valve
- Release: 2018; 8 years ago: Android May 2018; Linux ARM: December 2018 x64: March 2, 2021; iOS / tvOS May 15, 2019; Windows February 4, 2021; macOS March 23, 2021
- Operating system: iOS, iPadOS, Android, Linux, macOS, Windows, tvOS, Android TV, Amazon Fire TV, Meta Horizon OS, visionOS, SteamOS
- Website: store.steampowered.com/steamlink

Steam Link is a software and discontinued hardware product developed by Valve Corporation for streaming Steam content from a personal computer or Steam Machine wirelessly to a mobile device or other monitor. Steam Link was originally released as a hardware device alongside the debut of Steam Machines in November 2015. Valve discontinued the Steam Link hardware device in November 2018, in favor of supporting its software-based Steam Link application for mobile devices and smart televisions, as well as providing Steam Link as a software package for the Raspberry Pi microcomputer.

== Functionality ==
Steam Link, whether in hardware or software form, supports the streaming of content from a personal computer running Steam to the video device (a connected television or monitor for the hardware unit, the mobile device's screen for the software version). In this setup, the device acting as the Steam Link (the hardware unit or the mobile device in software form) enables a game controller connected to it to be used to control the game over the connection to the home computer.

Prior to March 2019, both the personal computer and the Steam Link hardware device or mobile device using Steam Link software had to be on the same internal network. With an update in March 2019, Valve introduced the Steam Link Anywhere update that allows one to stream across the internet, though the performance of the streaming will be strongly affected by the bandwidth and latency between the personal computer and device with Steam Link.

== Software (application) ==
In May 2018, Valve announced it would release the Steam Link application for iOS, Android, tvOS, and Android TV devices that will allow users to play streaming games to these devices, without the need for the Link hardware. Apple initially rejected the application from its App Store because of "business conflicts with app guidelines", but it was eventually released on iOS in May 2019.

In December 2018, Valve released a Linux version of the Steam Link software for ARM architecture, initially targeting Raspberry Pi 3 and 3 B+. Steam Link was released for Windows 10 in February 2021. In March 2021, Valve released the app for x86-64 Linux platforms and macOS.

Steam Link had been released on Samsung smart TVs in 2018. However, with the introduction of Samsung's Gaming Hub across its devices, Samsung discontinued the app in November 2023.

Support was added to Apple Vision Pro using visionOS to stream non-VR games in June 2026.

=== Virtual reality ===
On November 30, 2023, Valve released a VR version of the Steam Link client for Meta Horizon OS, compatible with Quest 2 and newer. It allows the streaming of content from a PC running SteamVR over a local Wi-Fi network. On Meta Quest Pro, eye and facial tracking data can also be transmitted to VR software using OSC. The software competes primarily with the Horizon OS "Air Link" feature, and third-party app Virtual Desktop. In October 2024, Quest hand tracking support was added as part of the SteamVR 2.8 update, supporting games such as Half-Life: Alyx among others.

In September 2025, Steam Link was released for additional Android-based headsets, including HTC Vive Focus Vision, PICO 4/4 Ultra and Neo3, and announced plans for a standalone APK release for experimental use on unsupported devices.

A SteamOS version of Steam Link will be used on the Steam Frame headset.

== Hardware device ==
Steam Link
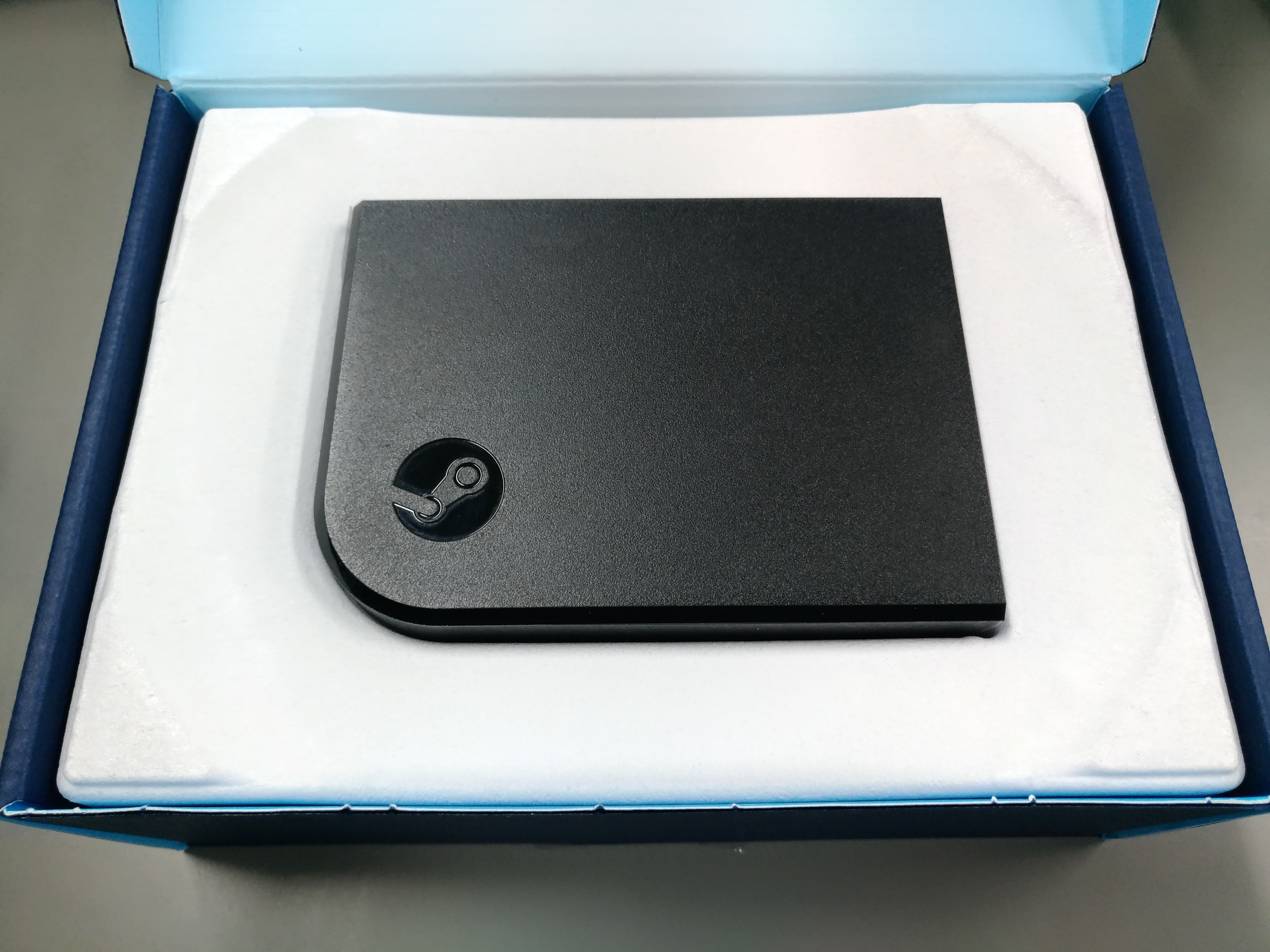
- Developer: Valve
- Type: Set-top box
- Released: November 10, 2015
- Lifespan: 2015–2018
- Introductory price: US$49.99
- Discontinued: November 2018 (hardware only)
- Operating system: Customized Linux
- System on a chip: Marvell DE3005-A1
- CPU: 1.0 GHz Single-core ARMv7
- Memory: 512 MB Shared Memory (256 MB system / 256 MB GPU)
- Storage: 4 GB
- Graphics: Vivante GC1000 GPU
- Controller input: Steam Controller; Most other gamepads
- Connectivity: 802.11ac WiFi, Bluetooth 4.0, 100 Mbit/s Fast Ethernet
- Online services: Steam
- Dimensions: 0.59 in (15 mm) H; 4.85 in (123 mm) W; 3.53 in (90 mm) D
- Website: Steam Link

Steam Link was originally released as a stand-alone hardware device to enable streaming of Steam content from a personal computer wirelessly to a television set, coinciding with the debut of the Steam Machine hardware platform in November 2015. It was quietly discontinued in November 2018, in favor of supporting its software-based Steam Link application for mobile devices, smart televisions, and a software package for the Raspberry Pi.

The hardware device is listed as having the following technical specifications:

- Wired 100 Mbit/s Fast Ethernet and Wireless 802.11ac 2×2 (MIMO)
- 3× USB 2.0 ports
- Bluetooth 4.0
- HDMI out
- Support for the following control peripherals: Steam Controller, DualShock 4 or 3, Sixaxis, Xbox One or 360 Wired Controller, Xbox 360 Wireless Controller for Windows, Wii Remote, Wii U Pro Controller, Logitech Wired Gamepad F310 or Wired Rumble Gamepad F510 or Wireless Gamepad F710 or Dual Action Gamepad or Rumblepad 2 or Cordless Rumblepad 2, Razer Panthera Arcade Stick or Panthera Evo Arcade Stick, Thrustmaster GP XID Pro, Hori Fighting Commander OCTA or Fighting Stick α (Alpha) or Fighting Stick Mini, Nacon GC-100XF or GC-200WL or GC-400ES, SteelSeries Stratus Duo or XL, Mad Catz C.A.T. 7, or keyboard and mouse

A tear-down revealed the following specific hardware parts:

- Marvell DE3005-A1 CPU
- Marvell WiFi chip 88W8897
- Vivante GC1000 GPU

The Steam Link comes with power adapters for various countries.

=== Software (hardware) ===
==== Operating system ====
The hardware device uses a modified version of Linux based on version 3.8 of the Linux kernel. It is possible to enable root SSH access to the system.

==== SDK ====
One month after release, support was added to the Steam Link to have Steam Link apps, which can be created using an SDK. A number of such apps have been created, such as apps for accessing Kodi, but no database or store for them exists as of November 2017.

==== Games and applications ====
Any Steam game that can run on the host computer can be streamed to the Steam Link. On Linux host it is also possible to stream a Windows game using the Proton beta (released August 2018). Non-Steam games can be played as well.

==== Discontinuation ====
Valve announced in November 2018 that they are no longer manufacturing the Steam Link hardware device, and will sell off the remaining stock. Valve will continue to support software and device updates to existing Steam Link hardware, but are directing users towards the mobile app to provide the same functionality.
