= Digital Homicide Studios =

American video game developer

Digital Homicide Studios L.L.C.
- Type: Private
- Industry: Video games
- Founded: 2014; 12 years ago
- Founders: James Romine; Robert Romine
- Defunct: October 2016
- Headquarters: Yuma, Arizona, US
- Key people: James Romine; Robert Romine
- Products: The Slaughtering Grounds

Digital Homicide Studios L.L.C. was an American video game developer based in Yuma, Arizona. James and Robert Romine founded the company in 2014 and released poorly received games in quick succession. The studio produced roughly sixty games until September 2016, including The Slaughtering Grounds, Temper Tantrum, and Galactic Hitman. The Slaughtering Grounds, Digital Homicide Studios's best-known title, was released via Steam in October 2014. James Stephanie Sterling's criticism of the game led to a dispute with Digital Homicide Studios and eventually a lawsuit by James Romine against Sterling. Romine also filed a lawsuit against 100 anonymous Steam users in September 2016, accusing them of harassment. In response to the latter, Valve removed all Digital Homicide Studios games from Steam, which Romine stated "destroyed" the studio by October 2016. He subsequently withdrew the lawsuit, while that against Sterling was dismissed with prejudice in February 2017.

== History ==
=== Founding and game releases ===
Digital Homicide Studios was founded by brothers James Oliver Romine Jr. and Robert Romine in 2014 in Yuma, Arizona. Robert Romine had previously been a liquor salesman. The studio rapidly created small PC games, producing about sixty by September 2016. These included The Slaughtering Grounds, Gnarltoof's Revenge, Krog Wars, Paranormal Psychosis, Temper Tantrum, and Wyatt Derp. Digital Homicide Studios used the community-driven game approval process Steam Greenlight to have its titles released on the Steam service. The studio gave away copies of games like Ark: Survival Evolved and Rocket League in exchange for approval votes, which violated the Steam Greenlight guidelines. Many of Digital Homicide Studios's games were criticized as "amateurish, rushed and cobbled together from recycled assets". Tobias Ritter of GameStar referred to them as "a mountain of trash games". John Walker of Rock Paper Shotgun reviewed the studio's Galactic Hitman in October 2015, calling it potentially the worst game on Steam at the time.

The Slaughtering Grounds, a first-person shooter, was among Digital Homicide Studios's first releases on Steam. The game tasks the player with shooting zombies across three levels. A level is completed if the player survives in it for sixteen minutes and sixteen seconds. The Slaughtering Grounds runs on the Unity game engine and largely uses assets purchased from the Unity Asset Store. It was released through Steam on October 31, 2014. An update with bug fixes was released in early November 2014, and Steam Trading Cards were added in April 2015. For this release, Digital Homicide Studios used the nom de plume "ImminentUprising". Later releases used various other names, such as "Micro Strategic Game Designs" and "ECC Games". GameStar's Maurice Weber suggested that these pseudonyms were used to dissociate the games from Digital Homicide Studios and noted that, in many cases, they made it indiscernible who was developing the games in question.

=== James Stephanie Sterling dispute and lawsuit ===
In November 2014, James Stephanie Sterling, a video game journalist known for lampooning video games of perceived poor quality, released a ten-minute Let's Play video of The Slaughtering Grounds, repeatedly criticizing the game and labeling it as a "New 'Worst Game of 2014' Contender". They regarded the game as an asset flip, a game made poorly and quickly from art assets purchased from online stores. Sterling's videos were among the most exposure the game received at the time, with one of them appearing as the second search result on Google Search and as the first on YouTube, whereas The Slaughtering Grounds received no reviews indexed by the review aggregator website Metacritic. In response to Sterling's criticism, Digital Homicide Studios published a video dubbed "Review the Reviewer", reusing Sterling's video in its entirety with additional overlaid text that called Sterling "a fucking idiot" and accused them of playing the game incorrectly. Sterling subsequently produced a follow-up video in which they narrated and commented on Digital Homicide Studios's remarks. Digital Homicide Studios defended its use of purchased assets in a second response video, citing that it was "necessary from a production standpoint" and part of the "cycle of cash flow" in the indie game scene. Both response videos were later deleted.

Digital Homicide Studios eventually filed a DMCA takedown against Sterling's original video. Through two statements, the company said that the takedown was not censorship of Sterling's opinion, but rather a response to copyright infringement and damages the video had caused. Digital Homicide Studios said that it objected to Sterling's use of "'Worst Game of 2014' Contender" and "absolute failure" as descriptions for the game, calling them "unfair and unreasonable use of our copyright material". Both statements were later deleted. Sterling's video was temporarily removed as a result of the takedown, though reinstated by March 2016. The studio's moves against Sterling, which Weber described as an overreaction, attracted further criticism. Digital Homicide Studios would later delete negative comments from the Steam forums for its games. Weber argued that these actions tarnished the studio's reputation. Sterling and Robert Romine discussed their differences in a Skype conversation in July 2015. Patrick Klepek of Kotaku called the exchange "equal parts awkward and contentious" because the two parties approached it from opposing perspectives and because Romine eventually suggested that someone could sue Sterling over their actions. Sterling continued covering Digital Homicide Studios's games after this interaction.

After four months of preparation, on March 4, 2016, James Romine filed a lawsuit against Sterling with the United States District Court for the District of Arizona. The lawsuit accused Sterling of "assault, libel, and slander", citing nine counts of libel per se. Romine sought to receive a total of US$10.761 million, although the individual claims—$2.261 million in direct product damage; $4.3 million in emotional, reputational, and financial distress; and $5 million in punitive damage requests—added up to $11.561 million. Additionally, the lawsuit asked for "apologies in place of every offending article and video for a period of no less than 5 years". Romine had "worked for hundreds of hours since early 2015" to learn about the legal system to be able to represent himself in court. Additionally, the company launched a crowdfunding campaign to hire a "premium online defamation law firm" for the lawsuit. This effort was suspended shortly after its announcement due to "harassers donating amounts specifically to cause charges". The campaign was to raise $75,000 but received less than $500.

The lawsuit process stalled after Sterling's side filed a motion to dismiss in May 2016, arguing that Sterling's comments were "protected commentary and opinion" rather than libel. Later amendments to the suit raised the total reimbursement to $15 million. The court later dismissed the suit because Romine had filed it as an individual but claimed damages for the company, although he was given the option to amend and refile his complaint. After Sterling's lawyer, Bradley Hartman, convinced Romine to drop the lawsuit, the court dismissed it with prejudice on February 20, 2017. Both Sterling and Romine were ordered to cover their respective court costs.

=== Steam users lawsuit ===
The Romine brothers perceived "relentless online harassment" from certain Steam users. According to them, this included impersonation, accusations of theft, threats of violence, death threats, and derogatory comments about the Romine brothers and Robert Romine's wife, which had spanned more than eighteen months. They stated that negative comments about Digital Homicide Studios's games had continued after April 2016, when they began releasing games under their names instead of the company's. After being ignored by Steam and turned down by the Federal Bureau of Investigation, the Romine brothers contacted the Sheriff's Office of Yuma County in June 2016. They were initially rejected and returned in person that August, providing documents depicting "hundreds of the worst comments". In response, the Romine brothers were told to sue these users.

On September 12, 2016, James Romine filed a lawsuit against 100 anonymous Steam users. Most of these were part of a Steam group called "Digital Homicides", which accused Digital Homicide Studios of abusing the Steam Greenlight process. The lawsuit called this group an "organized hate and harassment group ... that specifically formed on [Steam] to financially destroy and harass The Plaintiff". It further alleged that eleven of these users, who were referenced by their Steam usernames, had published a total of 20,000 posts containing harassment on Steam, Reddit, YouTube, and other social media platforms. Through the lawsuit, Romine sought $18 million for personal injuries. Claims included the purposeful posting of negative reviews about Digital Homicide Studios's games and requests that Sterling produce further videos covering the company. Romine further requested a subpoena against Valve, the owner of Steam, to have the company provide the identities of the users being sued. Romine again represented himself, while a crowdfunding campaign to support the lawsuit was set up through GoFundMe.

On September 16, in response to the lawsuit, Valve removed Digital Homicide Studios's entire catalog (composed of twenty-one games and fifteen pieces of downloadable content) and all of its Steam Greenlight items from the platform. Steam had been the studio's largest distributor up to that point. Valve's vice president of marketing, Doug Lombardi, stated that Valve had ceased doing business with Digital Homicide Studios "for being hostile to Steam customers". In response, Romine accused Valve of failing to provide a "safe environment" for the studio and showing "a reckless disregard for the wellbeing of their community for profits". The Romines consequently considered filing a lawsuit against Valve for "removing [their games] and publicly stating why" and were seeking a lawyer to represent Digital Homicide Studios in such a case. The games continued to be sold via Itch.io. In October 2016, James Romine stated that, due to the removal of the company's games from Steam, the business had been "destroyed". He filed for the lawsuit against the Steam users to be dismissed without prejudice, citing that he could no longer afford to pursue it, although he noted that his case was still "solid".

== Legacy ==
As a result of James Romine's two lawsuits, Digital Homicide Studios has been labeled as "litigious". GameStar's Weber cited the studio as "Steam's worst developer". In May 2017, Digital Spy ranked the lawsuit against Sterling fifth on its list of the "5 silliest legal scraps" in the video game industry. Nathan Grayson of Kotaku opined in September 2016 that both of James Romine's lawsuits and the surrounding controversy could have been avoided if Valve had taken a larger role in Steam's release curation, which would have halted the release of Digital Homicide Studios's games. He also believed that the company "allows and systemically endorses Steam users to behave in ways that are toxic, verging on abusive, with developers and each other", thus enabling parts of the substance of Romine's second lawsuit.
