= Asset flip =

Video game mass-developed using pre-made assets

An asset flip is a type of shovelware in which a video game developer purchases pre-made assets and is perceived to use them to create numerous permutations of generic games to sell at low prices. Such games tend to be viewed by gamers as uncreative, and as diverting attention from less popular high-quality titles. Asset flips have been noted to be a problem on many online distribution platforms, especially Steam. The Nintendo Switch eShop has also been accused of allowing the sale of asset flips.

As mobile gaming became popular during the 2010s, app stores such as the Google Play Store have predominantly featured games which utilize "knockoffs" of popular IPs in a similar format. As the required investments are lower for users and publishers alike, mobile asset flips derive profits from free-to-play downloads with frequent in-game advertising and/or a freemium model.

== Definition ==
The term asset flip was coined by games journalist James Stephanie Sterling around 2015. The term is largely applied in a pejorative sense, referring to low quality games produced using pre-made assets. Vice referred to such titles as "cobbled together, barely-functioning games". The meaning of the term received considerable debate after the launch of PUBG: Battlegrounds (Note: Initially titled PlayerUnknown's Battlegrounds.) in 2017, as while the game made use of pre-made assets, it was successful and influential in the development of battle royale as a genre.

== History ==
The asset flip game rose to prominence in the 2010s with the advent of pre-made royalty-free assets. The Unity store launched in 2010. Unity acknowledged the problem of "flips" in a 2015 blog post, and Sterling's initial coining of the term took place around this time. In February 2017, developers Digital Homicide Studios were accused of creating asset flips by Sterling, who reviewed one of their games, The Slaughtering Grounds. In response, they sued Sterling for US $10 million, as well as anonymous Steam users for US $18 million. These lawsuits were dismissed, and the developer's games were removed from Steam for violating their terms of service.

In September 2017, Steam removed 173 asset flip titles released by the studio Silicon Echo and associated accounts. 86 of those titles had been launched in the two months before the crackdown, accounting for approximately 10% of all games added to Steam in the period. The games were constructed out of assets from the Unity store, and were released in bulk after the studio had found a means of circumventing the $100 listing fee using a bundle mechanic. Valve released a statement addressing the move, stating: "this person was mass-shipping nearly-identical products on Steam that were impacting the store’s functionality and making it harder for players interested in finding fun games to play".

In 2018, Steam declared, after pulling the school shooting game Active Shooter, that it would "allow everything" on its platform regardless of quality. Valve engineer Erik Johnson later clarified that Steam would only remove "obvious troll" games, despite the contention of critics and gamers that asset flips are harmful to players, developers and Steam itself. The steadily increasing amount of asset flips on Steam, due to a loosening of inclusion criteria, led to what commentators called the "Steampocalypse", in which discoverability for most indie developers dropped precipitously regardless of game quality.

2018 also saw the release of Asset Flip Simulator on Steam on May 4 of that year, a game designed to criticise the practice.

== Criticism of the term ==
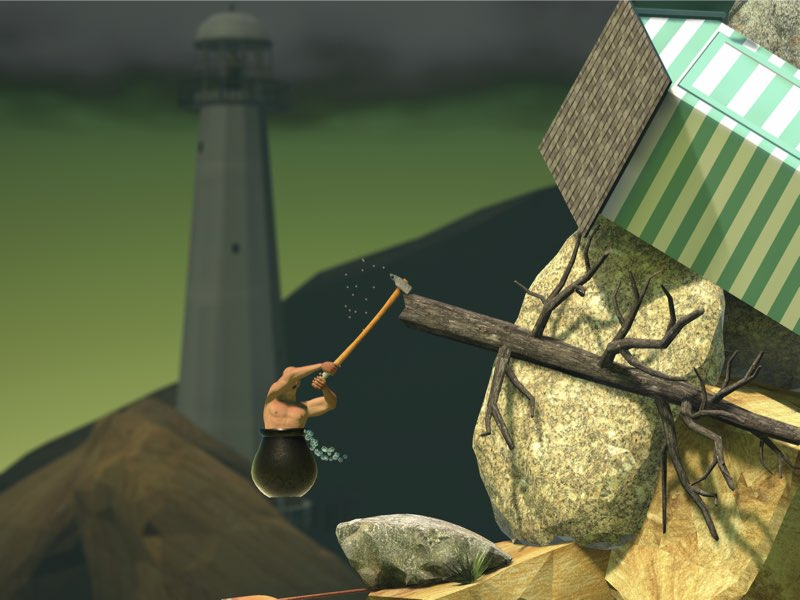
Bennett Foddy's 2017 game Getting Over It features bought assets, and the game's protagonist is an Adobe Fuse stock character model.

Developer Bennett Foddy has lamented the inconsistent use of the term asset flip as a pejorative, saying that some well-regarded games feature a large number of bought assets, including his own game Getting Over It which he felt could "reasonably be described" as an asset flip.

== See also ==
- Video game clone
