= Standoff =

Standoff or stand-off may refer to:

== Deadlocked situations ==
- Impasse, two sides unable to reach an agreement and deadlocked
- Stalemate, a chess term, used metaphorically
- Mexican standoff, a confrontation where no strategy exists that allows any party to achieve victory

== Arts and entertainment ==
- Standoff (TV series), a 2006–2007 American drama
- Standoff (film), a 2016 film
- Stand Off, North American title of Whole Lotta Sole, a 2012 film
- "Standoff" (Homeland), a TV episode
- Standoff (video game), formerly Active Shooter

== Other uses ==
- Spacers and standoffs, a device that maintains a fixed distance between two objects
- Stand Off, Alberta, a place in Canada
- Stand-off, or five-eighth, a position in rugby league
- Stand-off, British name for fly-half in rugby union

== See also ==
- Standoff distance, a security term
- Standoff missile, missiles or bombs launched from a distance
- Shootout, an armed confrontation
