= Xi3 Piston =

Xi3 Modular Computer

Xi3 "Piston"

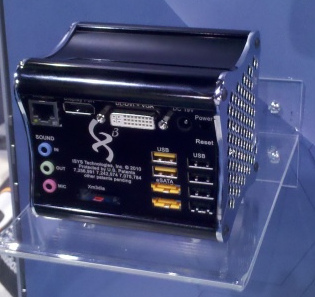
- The Xi3 Modular computer at CES 2011
- Codename: Piston
- Also known as: Xi3 Modular computer
- Developer: Steam
- Manufacturer: Xi3
- Released: November 29, 2013
- Introductory price: $999.99
- Discontinued: 10 November 2015
- Operating system: Windows
- CPU: AMD R-Series R464L quad-core processor (2.3 GHz base, up to 3.2 GHz turbo) @ Up to 3.2 Ghz if overclocked, 2.3Ghz base
- Memory: 8 Gigabytes (DDR3 RAM)
- Storage: 128GB mSATA solid-state drive (upgradeable via dual SSD slots up to 1TB total)
- Graphics: Integrated AMD Radeon HD 7660G (384 shader cores, 496 MHz base up to 685 MHz turbo)
- Power: 40 to 50W

The Xi3 Piston or Xi3 Modular Computer is a small form factor PC designed by Xi3 for playing Steam games. It was created by Xi3 for CES 2013 with Valve Corporation. It was first starting to be developed in 2011-2012 amid industry rumors that Valve was developing a new personal computing device to directly compete with consoles because of a fear of the emerging "walled garden" app store ecosystem emerging from Windows 8.0/8.1. During the first announcement at CES 2013, Xi3 said that it had received some investment from Valve Corporation for the development of the Piston. The XI3 Piston was presented at both companies' booths.

== History ==
The technology behind the Piston grew out of a custom computing platform developed by Xi3 Corporation starting in 2009. Designed by company founder Jason A. Sullivan, the concept was a modular computer, different from traditional, single-board motherboards. Instead of soldering everything to one piece of fiberglass, Sullivan's design split the core components, the processor, memory, and input/output paths across three separate, interconnected circuit boards. Xi3 pitched this layout as an eco-friendly solution, arguing that users could easily swap out or upgrade individual parts instead of throwing away the entire machine when it became outdated. The company first proved this concept in 2011 with the release of the X5A, a commercial mini-PC that introduced the distinct, 4.27-inch aluminum cube chassis that the Piston would later adopt.

=== Partnership with Valve and cancellation ===
Valve publicly distanced itself from the project in March 2013, coinciding with Xi3 opening pre-orders for the computer. Valve marketing executive Doug Lombardi stated that while Valve had conducted early exploratory work with Xi3, the company had "no involvement in any product of theirs." Following the end of the partnership, Xi3 announced that while the Piston remained optimized for Steam, it would ship with the Windows operating system rather than a proprietary Linux-based platform, allowing users to access competing digital storefronts. Valve announced its official Steam Machines ecosystem later that year.

== Reception ==
Critical reception of the Xi3 Piston following its 2013 launch was negative. At a base price of $999.99, critics noted that consumers could build a significantly more powerful, GPU desktop computer for under 75% of the cost of the Piston. Outlets observed that because the internal hardware relied entirely on an integrated AMD Trinity APU rather than a graphics card, its real-world gaming performance was inadequate to justify the premium price. Because the console launched on standard Windows rather than a curated gaming interface, reviewers said that the product lacked a clear target demographic, failing to appeal to either mainstream console gamers or core PC enthusiasts.

== Background and development ==
The Piston itself was directly modeled after a subsequent high-performance variant known as the Xi3 X7A. While retaining the core modularity and cube-shaped form factor of the X7A, the Piston was modified to include dedicated software optimization and support for Valve Corporation's Steam platform and its Big Picture mode interface.
