= James Stephanie Sterling =

British video game critic

- Born: Erith, London, England
- Other name: Commander Sterling
- Occupations: Video game critic; web video producer; livestreamer; professional wrestler

YouTube information
- Channel: Stephanie Sterling
- Years active: 2006–present
- Genre: Video game industry journalism
- Subscribers: 721 thousand
- Views: 561.8 million
- Last updated: 23 April 2026

James Stephanie Sterling, also known as Commander Sterling and formerly known as Jim Sterling, is a British freelance video game journalist, critic, pundit, YouTuber, and professional wrestler. Before becoming independent in September 2014, she (Note: Sterling is transfeminine and uses both she/her and they/them pronouns. This article uses she/her for consistency.) was the review editor for Destructoid, and an author for The Escapist. Sterling is noted as an example of a YouTuber achieving success through crowdfunding.

== Career ==
=== Video game critic ===
Sterling presents The Jimquisition, a weekly YouTube video series in which she discusses current issues surrounding video games, often involving consumer protection and ethics in the video game industry. The series originated on Destructoid's YouTube channel and was later moved to The Escapist's channel, before being released on Sterling's own channel. Her main gameplay series are "Jimpressions" and "Squirty Play", where she discussed her impressions of a recently released video game while showing her own pre-recorded gameplay. She has often spoken against sexism in gaming, and has been open about the fact that her position on this subject has slowly evolved.

In November 2014, Sterling announced that she was leaving The Escapist and intended to seek funding for her work independently through Patreon. On a 2020 episode of The Jimquisition, she stated that she had departed The Escapist after the publication had refused to publish her negative review of Assassin's Creed Unity, citing that parent company Defy Media was afraid of damaging any sponsorship opportunities with Ubisoft. Sterling also stated her desire to go back to writing articles and recording podcasts, which she was not able to do since leaving Destructoid. She currently maintains her own website, The Jimquisition, in addition to producing a podcast titled "Podquisition", which is shared with fellow British game journalist and founding host, Laura Kate Dale. The third founding member/co-host, Irish musician Gavin Dunne, had his final permanent appearance on episode 250, leaving to pursue a musical career. Gavin was replaced on episode 251 with Conrad Zimmerman, who had previously worked alongside Sterling at Destructoid.

In March 2016, Digital Homicide Studios filed a lawsuit against Sterling, seeking $10 million in damages for "assault, libel, and slander", following Sterling's negative review of their first game The Slaughtering Grounds. Sterling further accused Digital Homicide Studios of deleting negative feedback of the game on its Steam review page, and banning users who criticized it. The lawsuit was raised to $15 million, before it was eventually dismissed with prejudice in late February 2017.

Sterling has been credited with coining the term chungus, which would later be part of the name of the "Big Chungus" meme. Sterling started using the term as early as 2012 on her channel in a variety of unrelated contexts with different meanings for humorous effect. She was also credited with coining asset flip in 2015.

=== Wrestling ===
Sterling wrestles under the name Commander Sterling. Sterling initially became involved in wrestling as a joke, appearing as a character called Sterdust, parodying Cody Rhodes' character Stardust, later appearing as a heel manager, before taking up wrestling herself, also as a heel. She has wrestled for promotions including Pro Wrestling EGO, Ryse Wrestling, BadBoys Wrestling (BBW), and the PolyAm Cult Party.

=== Voice actor and video game writer ===
Sterling joined the writing team for Vampire Survivors in 2022, writing the game bestiary. She has also provided voices for Jazzpunk, We Happy Few, 2064: Read Only Memories, Volume, The Charnel House Trilogy, Lorelai, Mewgenics, and Oddworld: Soulstorm.

== Reception ==
In 2011 Sterling was featured in a list of "the 25 raddest game journalists to follow on Twitter" by Complex. She has developed into a controversial figure in the world of video game journalism, particularly for her criticisms of industry practices and focus on consumer protection. Fans of some highly anticipated games, including No Man's Sky and The Legend of Zelda: Breath of the Wild, have launched DDoS attacks against Sterling's website following reviews that were believed to be insufficiently positive.

Sterling's views on art games have been criticized by Spelunky creator Derek Yu. In 2014, Yu compared Sterling's view to that of art critic Louis Leroy writing in 1874 of a Claude Monet painting which Leroy criticized for being unfinished, while the style of painting would later become a major art style.

== Personal life ==
Sterling was born in London, where she said she lived near the poverty line for much of her childhood. In a 2015 video about polyamorous relationships in Fallout 4, Sterling said she is not monogamous. She is pansexual and queer. In June 2020, she was naturalized as a Citizen of the United States. In August 2020, Sterling came out as non-binary. Sterling uses she/them pronouns.
