= ZOTAC =

Hong Kong computer hardware company

ZOTAC Technology Pte. Limited
- Type: Private
- Industry: Computer hardware Electronics
- Founded: 20 September 2006; 20 years ago
- Headquarters: Mapletree Business City, Singapore, Singapore
- Number of locations: 5 offices worldwide
- Area served: Worldwide
- Key people: Tony Wong (CEO)
- Products: Personal computers; graphics cards; peripherals; workstations
- Revenue: ▲HK$917.0 million(2015); HK$612.8 million (2014)
- Parent: PC Partner; SEHK: 1263; SGX: PCT
- Website: zotac.com

ZOTAC Technology Pte. Limited is a computer hardware manufacturer based in Singapore. The company specializes in producing video cards (GPUs), mini PCs, solid-state drives, motherboards, gaming computers and other computer accessories. All its products are manufactured in the PC Partner factories in Batam, Indonesia, and Dongguan City, China.

Aside from its international headquarters in Singapore, it also has five offices overseas in Hong Kong, Japan, South Korea, the United States, and Germany.

== Name ==
ZOTAC's name was derived from the words "zone" and "tact".

== History ==
PC Partner was divided from company VTech in 1997. ZOTAC was established in 2006 under the umbrella company of PC Partner. Its name was derived from the words "zone" and "tact". A year later, ZOTAC created its first ever video card, the ZOTAC GeForce 7300 GT. ZOTAC CUP, the global platform for casual and professional gamers to connect and compete, is established in the same year and online gaming tournament goes live.

In 2015, ZOTAC created a Steam Machine called the NEN. It featured a Nvidia GeForce 960 and an Intel Core i5-6400T Processor.

In 2016, The MAGNUS EN980 debuted at Computex Taipei. It was the first ever Mini PC that was considered "VR ready" by Nvidia, and it featured an Nvidia GTX 980 and an i5 Processor. Also launched is the smallest Mini PC line-up, P Series, and ZOTAC VR GO.

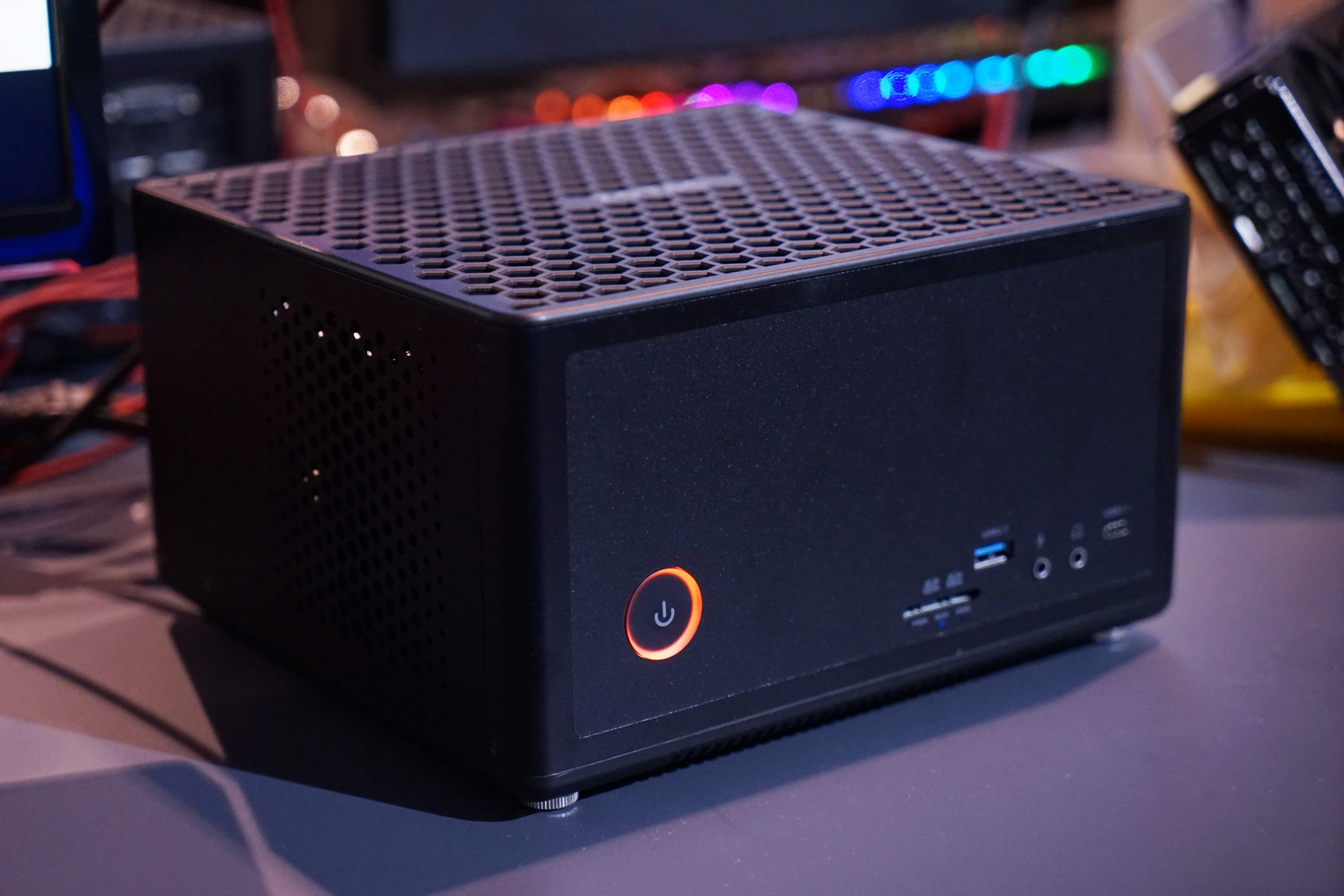
A ZOTAC ZBOX E-series Mini PC

In 2017, ZOTAC released their GTX 1000 series line including their 1080, 1070, 1060, and also their miniseries including the GeForce GTX 1080 Ti Mini. They also introduced their new brand now known as 'ZOTAC Gaming'. The first product launched under it was the MEK Gaming PC, which was a Mini ITX desktop. In addition to the MEK Gaming PC and graphic cards, ZOTAC also released an external enclosure that supported Thunderbolt 3 and could host a graphic card up to nine inches long.

In 2018, ZOTAC announced their GeForce 20 series graphics cards including the GeForce RTX 2080 Ti, GeForce RTX 2080 series, and the GeForce RTX 2070 Series. In addition to graphic cards, ZOTAC also released their new line of ZBOX mini PCs in Q2 2018.

In 2024, PC Partner relocated its headquarters to Singapore.
