= Steam Trading Cards =

Digital good

A Half-Life 2 Steam Trading Card, depicting the G-Man

Steam Trading Cards are a digital commodity issued by Valve for use on its digital distribution service, Steam. Steam Trading Cards are a non-physical analogue of conventional trading cards, which are periodically granted to Steam users for playing games, fulfilling tasks, or by random chance. Cards can be "crafted" to acquire Steam-centric awards such as emoticons or profile backgrounds, traded to other Steam users, or sold through the Steam Community Market for store credit.

Since their introduction in 2013, Steam Trading Card sets have been integrated into over 11,000 games as of 2022. The developer revenue gained through trading card sales has attracted undesirable attention from "asset flippers"; developers who release low-quality games onto Steam solely to profit from their trading cards. In a series of blog posts, Valve condemned this behavior, calling such games "fake", and claimed that trading card farming was responsible for damaging the Steam storefront.

== History ==
In the years prior to the introduction of Steam Trading Cards, Valve implemented multiple features into Steam to facilitate the trading, buying, and selling of virtual goods. Steam Trading was introduced in 2011, which allows users to trade virtual game items between each other. During the 2011 Steam Winter Sale, users could complete objectives in select games to receive virtual "coal" which could then be redeemed for prizes, a progenitor to the system that would later be utilized for Steam Trading Cards. The Steam Community Market was introduced in late 2012, which enables Steam users to buy and sell virtual goods with store credit.

Steam Trading Cards entered open beta in May 2013, with six games initially participating in the system.

== Description ==
Like their physical counterparts, Steam Trading Cards are a collectible commodity which are routinely traded, bought, and sold. Supported games each have their own set of trading cards, which typically incorporate game art in their designs. After collecting a full set of trading cards, the user has the option to "craft" the cards, permanently removing them from their Steam inventory in exchange for a game-themed emoticon, profile background, profile badge, and an amount of Steam "XP". XP can be used to increase a profile's level, which unlocks more profile customization options, increases the friend limit cap, and raises the probability of "booster pack" trading card drops. Standard game badges award the user with 100 XP every level. These badges can be upgraded up to 5 times, with each level of the badge displaying a new image.

== Distribution ==
Steam Trading Cards are distributed through several methods; if a game has a trading card set, playing that game will periodically grant the player trading cards until a threshold is met. For most games, this threshold is reached once the user has received half the number of cards required for a full set. For free to play games, cards won't drop until the player makes a purchase associated with that game. "Booster packs", which contain a random assortment of three cards from a game, will periodically drop for users who have hit the drop threshold.

During seasonal sales, Valve releases unique trading card sets to coincide with the event. These sets are only available for a limited time, and can be obtained by making Steam purchases, crafting sets of trading cards, or completing event-specific goals, such as browsing through a queue of games.

== Impact ==
As Steam Trading Cards afforded developers a means to generate revenue beyond game sales, trading cards soon became one of the driving forces behind "asset flipping", the process by which Steam games are cheaply and quickly made, often with store-bought assets and minimal differences between each other, in the hopes of netting profit through trading card sales. In an April 2017 joint conference with game commentators James Stephanie Sterling and John "TotalBiscuit" Bain, Valve agreed that a large portion of games on Steam only existed to "mill" cards for profit, with Valve labeling these asset flips as "fake games". In May 2017, Valve claimed that these "fake games" harmed Steam by feeding "faux data" into the storefront's algorithm, which resulted in asset flips being granted a disproportionate amount of storefront exposure relative to the number of people actually playing them. To counter this, Valve implemented a "confidence metric" system, wherein trading cards can only drop for games which pass a sales threshold.

In September 2017, Valve ended their business relationships with Silicon Echo Studios, who were implicated in an asset flipping scheme involving numerous developer accounts managed by the same person. Under multiple aliases, the studio had released 86 games onto Steam in the two months prior, accounting for 10 percent of all games released during those months.
