= Steam Machines =

Line of gaming PCs

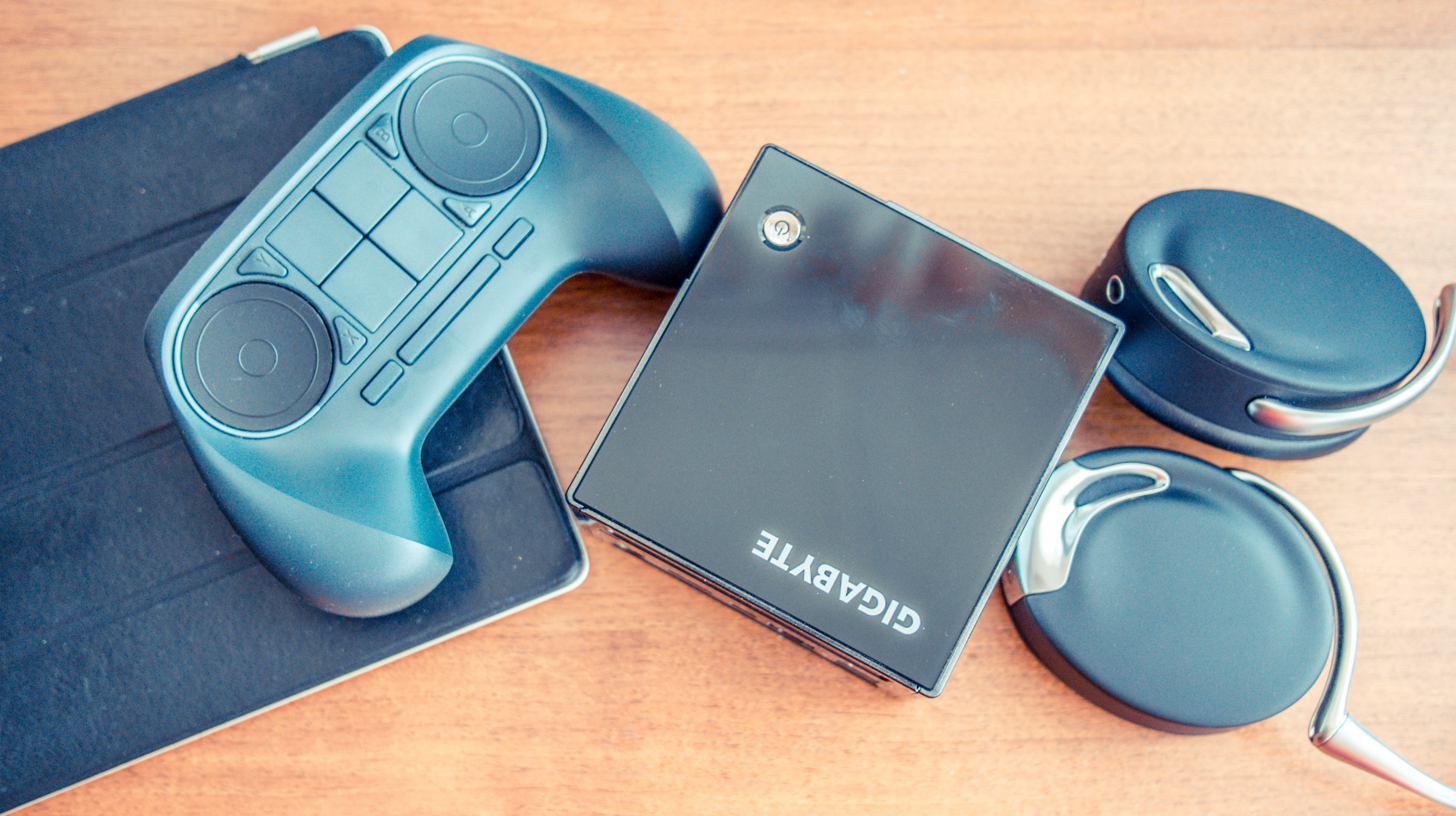
- Gigabyte Technology Steam Machine next to an early prototype of the Steam Controller
- Developer: Valve Corporation
- Manufacturer: Various
- Type: Gaming computer
- Released: November 10, 2015
- Discontinued: April 2, 2018
- Operating system: SteamOS
- Controller input: Steam Controller (1st generation)
- Online services: Steam
- Successor: Steam Deck (2022); Steam Machine (2026)
- Website: store.steampowered.com/sale/machines at the Wayback Machine (archived March 5, 2018)

Steam Machines are a discontinued family of small form factor gaming computers, designed to run SteamOS and the digital Steam storefront, and provide a home game console-like experience. They were developed by Valve in collaboration with several computer vendors who were engaged with Valve to develop their own computers for retail, offering additional options atop Valve's requirements such as dual-booting options with Windows and the ability to upgrade the computer. To support Steam Machines and SteamOS, Valve released the Steam Controller, a customizable game controller with touchpad-based haptic feedback, and the Steam Link, a device that allowed consumers with Steam software to stream content to a monitor. Following a two-year testing period, Steam Machines and its related hardware were released on November 10, 2015.

The Steam Machine idea was not considered successful, with the line being discontinued by 2018. Valve identified the lack of their own hardware and the restriction of Linux-native games as fatal flaws. Since then, Valve has developed the Proton emulation layer to run most Windows games on Linux without modification, and released the handheld Steam Deck Linux gaming computer in 2022, which featured this capability. Valve in November 2025 announced a new, singular iteration of the Steam Machine alongside a new slate of other gaming hardware, with the first units released in June 2026.

== History ==
Steam, a digital video games storefront offering many third-party game publishers' titles, was developed by Valve primarily for Windows and accounted for an estimated 75% of digitally purchased games on that platform in 2013. Valve has indicated displeasure with the approaches that both Microsoft and Apple are taking with their respective operating systems, limiting what applications could be run, and upon the release of Windows 8 in 2012, Valve's CEO Gabe Newell called it "a catastrophe for everyone in the PC space", and discussed the possibility of promoting the open-source operating system Linux that would maintain "the openness of the platform". Newell recognized that games would need to be a significant part of the push for Linux. An official Linux client for Steam was released in July 2012, along with developer tools to help port games to the platform. Valve worked to assure that users' game libraries would be portable, including offering Steam Play whereby purchase of a title for one platform automatically allows that user to play the title on other supported platforms, and cross-platform multiplayer features.

Prior to Valve's official announcement of Steam Machines, rumors of Valve's plan to get into the hardware market developed in the industry throughout 2012, based on aspects such as the emphasis on the Linux operating system and the introduction of features like the 10-foot user interface "Big Picture Mode" for Steam which would be a necessary feature for a video game console. Valve formally announced that it was considering developing a video game console near the end of 2012. Industry journalists tentatively called the hardware a "Steam Box". It would function as a dedicated unit running Steam to allow players to launch games, media, and other functions that the client already provides. The unit's hardware was expected to be tightly controlled in a similar manner to other video game consoles. The software side was expected to remain open; for example, the unit was expected to ship with a Linux operating system, but the user would be able to install Windows if they wanted to.

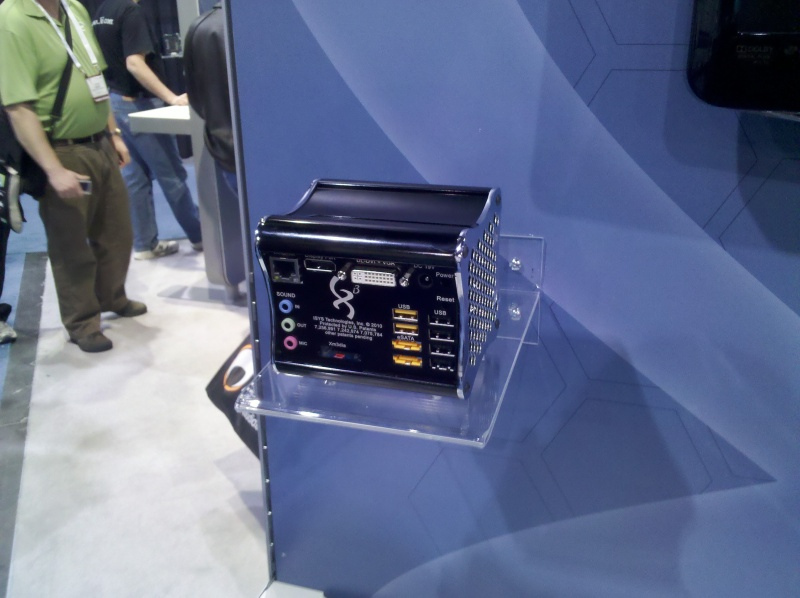
An Xi3 modular computer "Piston" prototype demonstrated at the 2011 CES that demonstrates many of the features planned to be added to the final Steam Machine hardware; Xi3 Corporation ceased collaboration with Valve since then, since the unit still shipped with Windows by default, and had mouse and keyboard inputs.

Gabe Newell explained that Valve's strategy was to develop a single hardware unit themselves as the default model, internally named "Bigfoot", and work with other computer manufacturers who want to offer the same user experience but with different hardware configurations not offered by Valve's model; for example, Valve did not expect to include an optical drive due to size and cost, but this could have been a feature offered by a manufacturing partner. He also envisioned the software to enable screencast capabilities, allowing the single box to work with any monitor or television within the home. Newell stated that they would've also likely developed controllers for the unit that integrate biometrics data from the player and options for gaze tracking, citing that the involuntary responses from the player are more useful than other forms of player input such as motion control. Newell also explained that Valve was also considering the mobile device market in addition to the home console market, specifically considering laptops and tablets with their own hardware nicknamed "Littlefoot". During the Steam Dev Days in January 2014, Valve further explained that the initial target market for Steam Machines was to be placed in the living room and build a demand for support for Linux versions of games such that they can continue to work away from Windows and OS X operating systems for the future.

At the 2013 Consumer Electronics Show, modular computer hardware company Xi3 Corporation introduced a prototype modular PC codenamed "Piston". This unit was one of several possible designs that Valve was looking as the default hardware model for the Steam Box, and was specifically designed to run Steam on Linux and support Big Picture mode. The unit was based on Xi3's "performance level" X7A model and was slightly larger than a human hand, containing various I/O ports to connect to power, video, and data signals. Xi3 began taking pre-orders for the Piston Console at the 2013 South by Southwest Festival in March 2013, anticipating high levels of interest in the hardware with plans to release the unit for general purchase by the end of 2013. Valve clarified that although they conducted some initial exploratory work with Xi3, they have had no direct involvement with the Piston's specifications, and it was not necessarily representative of the final design for the Steam Box.

Valve officially revealed Steam Machines including the related SteamOS and Steam Controller during the last week of September 2013, with a tentative release date in mid-2014. On December 13, 2013, three hundred beta units of the Steam Machine were shipped to selected beta testers for initial testing. An additional 2000 units were provided to developers attending the Steam Dev Days event in January 2014. Valve also released an early restricted download link for their SteamOS for "Linux hackers" to try out. Based on feedback from these testers, Valve announced in May 2014 that they have pushed back the anticipated release until November 2015. The first set of Steam Machines, Steam Controllers, and Steam Links were available for consumer purchase and delivery starting on November 10, 2015.

Several gaming websites observed that by April 2018, Valve no longer offered links to the Steam Machine section on the Steam storefront, and while it could be reached directly via a URL, many of the models previously offered were no longer listed. Valve responded that they recognized that Steam Machines were not selling well and saw little user traffic, prompting them to make the change to the storefront. Valve stated they remained committed to an open gaming platform and will continue to develop the back-end technologies like SteamOS that will help such efforts.

== Hardware ==
Unlike gaming consoles, the Steam Machine does not have a specific configuration of hardware, but a minimum specification of computer hardware components that would be needed to support the SteamOS operating system and games developed for it. Valve planned to have several different retail versions of the Steam Machine through various hardware manufacturers, that would also allow users to create their own units from components and or modify retail products with off-the-shelf parts as desired. The units were expected to arrive in 2014, with Valve expecting to announce its partners for this first line at the 2014 Consumer Electronics Show in early January. A core part of the machine configurations was the method of providing ventilation and cooling of the CPU, GPU, and power supply; Valve engineered custom compartments within these beta units so that each of these three units has separate circulation and ventilation routes. Valve also worked with AMD to develop and certify hardware for future Steam Machines.

=== Valve Steam Machine (prototype) ===
Valve began running a beta-testing program in late 2013, selecting 300 Steam users to test their optimized prototype hardware units and initial versions of the Steam Controllers. The initial prototypes sent to testers had several configurations, which includes the following:

- CPU: Intel Core i7-4770, i5-4570, or i3
- Graphics card: Nvidia GeForce GTX Titan, GTX 780, GTX 760, or GTX 660 with 3 GB GDDR5
- Main RAM: 16 GB DDR3-1600
- Hard drive: 1 TB/8 GB SSHD
- Power: 450 W power supply
- Measurement: 12 × 12.4 × 2.9 inches (305 × 315 × 74 mm)

Valve did not release a model of their own until 2026, instead offering devices from 3rd party manufacturers on their store.

=== Steam Machines ===
Steam Machines from 3rd party manufacturers became available for consumer purchase and delivery starting on November 10, 2015. By December 5, 2015 Alienware Steam Machine, Maingear DRIFT, Materiel.net Steam Machine, Scan 3XS ST Steam Machine, Syber Steam Machine, ZOTAC NEN Steam Machine were available for purchase. On November 9, 2015, the following additional models were listed on Steam page for Steam Machines: Alternate Steam Machine, Digital Storm Eclipse Steam Machine, Falcon Northwest Tiki Steam Machine, Gigabyte BRIX Pro, NextBox, ORIGIN OMEGA Steam Machine, Webhallen S15-01, ZOTAC Steam Machine SN970.. The prices varied form US$449 to US$6000. It is unclear if all of these models were available for sale.

==== Alienware Steam Machine ====
- Alienware Alpha / Alienware Steam Machine – A PC/console hybrid introduced in 2014. It shipped with Windows 8 and a wireless Xbox 360. Steam Machine variant was released in 2015, shipping with a version of the (at the time) Debian-based SteamOS; Windows could also be installed after purchase. It contains a custom-built Nvidia GeForce GTX 860M; a Core i3, i5, or i7 Intel Processor, depending on what model is purchased, up to 8 GB of RAM; and between 500 GB and 2 TB of hard drive space.
- Alienware Alpha R2 / Alienware Steam Machine R2 – Alienware's update to the small form factor released on June 13, 2016. It contains (depending on customer choice) an AMD Radeon R9 M470X GPU with 2 GB GDDR5 memory or an NVIDIA GeForce GTX 960 GPU with 4 GB GDDR5. The processor line chosen this rendition are 6th generation Intel processors; the i3-6100T, i5-6400T, or i7-6700T. The RAM from factory comes in either 1 stick of 8 GB or 16 GB configurations of DDR4 memory clocked at 2133 MHz, and the system comes with one SO-DIMM slot. Hard-drive options have been expanded to include a HDD, SSD, or both. The HDD comes in one size, 1 TB at 7200 RPM, whilst the SSD is available in the M.2 mini-PCIe standard ranging in sizes between 256 GB to 1 TB. The new console also has a Graphics Amplifier slot with all models except the AMD Radeon R9 M470X equipped variant. The console ships with Windows 10, and the Steam Machine with SteamOS.

=== SMACH Z ===
A handheld game console version of the Steam Machine was in development as the "SMACH Z", previously dubbed "Smach Zero" or "Steamboy" by analogy to Nintendo's Game Boy. The SMACH Z was to be released in November 2016 and was to combine a x86 Steam OS architecture based on an AMD G-Series chip with a portable form factor and input elements similar to those of a Steam controller. A Kickstarter crowdfunding campaign was launched in December 2015, and canceled a few days later with a promise of a restart. A new Kickstarter campaign was launched on October 16, 2016, with a much lower goal, and successfully ended with a total of €474,530 one month later. The processor was to be an AMD Raven Ridge V1605B, and the release date was to be sometime in April 2017. An InDemand indiegogo campaign was launched following the end of the Kickstarter campaign. As of 2016 the SMACH Z had not yet been approved by Valve as an official Steam Machine. On May 12, 2021, the Smach team announced they would be filing for bankruptcy, and that units were not likely to be shipped unless they got new investment.

== Steam Controller ==
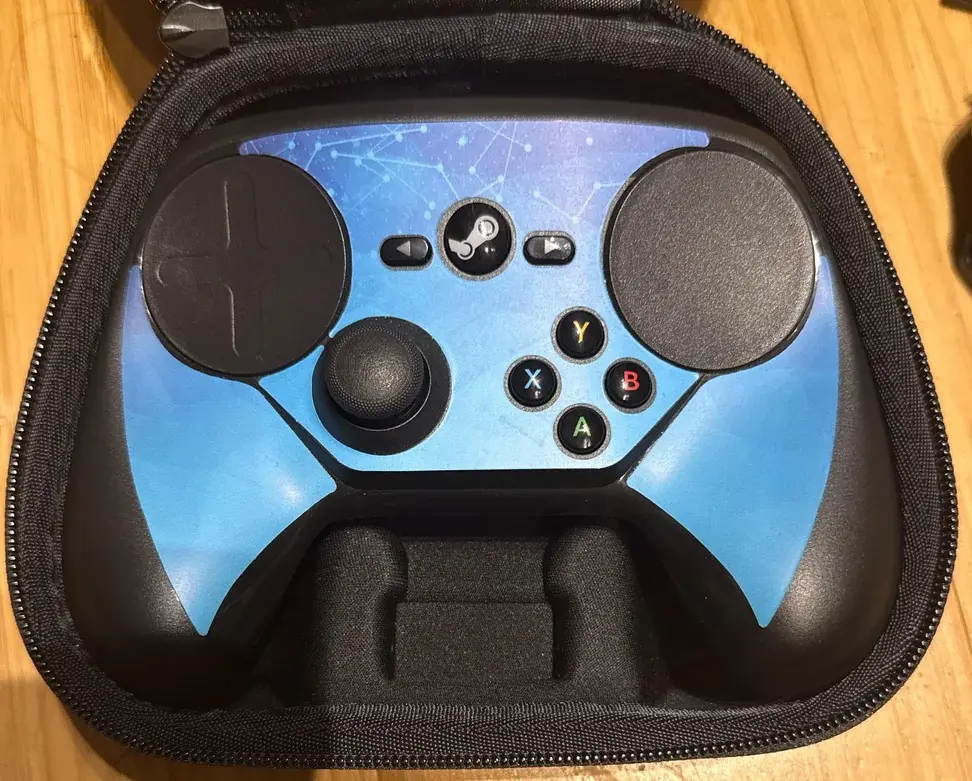
A Steam Controller that was given away during the Steam Dev Days 2016 event

The Steam Controller was released in November 2015. The Steam Controller was designed by Valve not only for games developed for controllers, but also for games traditionally played with keyboard and mouse controls. It features two high-resolution clickable touchpads (replacing the typical thumbsticks on modern console controllers), sixteen buttons, including face, shoulder, and undergrip buttons, and gyroscopic sensors for motion control. The touchpads include haptic feedback, which can send tactile feedback to the player in reaction to events within the game; Chris Kohler of Wired described using the controller while playing Civilization V at a press event at Valve, and noted that as he used the touchpad to move the mouse cursor, electromagnets within the controller created audio and tactile feedback as if he were using a trackball. Although the controller was designed for the Steam Machine platform, it can also be used with Steam on existing PCs.

The controller is designed to be used within Steam's Big Picture mode; this enables the player to access detailed options for setting up the various features of the controller on a per-game basis including button/touchpad mapping and sensitivity, as well as accessing other users' shared controller configuration to use themselves. The Steamworks API provides means for developers to provide more detailed settings for the Steam Controller when in Big Picture mode. Outside of Big Picture mode, the controller otherwise behaves as a standard two-stick controller. Valve has added improvements to the controller's capabilities based on public feedback, which include movement and aiming controls schemes using its internal gyroscope, the ability to trigger actions that enable cursor movement limited to certain regions on a UI (such as to manipulate a game's mini-map), a quick-access popup for 16 commands that can act similar to hotkeys for keyboard-and-mouse games, cloud-based controller configuration saving, and support for non-Steam games that otherwise can be played through the Steam Overlay.

Unlike their plan to have third-party hardware vendors manufacture Steam Machines, Valve had planned to be the sole manufacturer of the Steam Controller. Valve did clarify that they would open up specifications for third-party controllers to be developed. In March 2016, Valve released the computer aided design geometry files for the Steam controller, to facilitate hardware modding by end users. As of December 2015, Valve was working with Flextronics robotic assembly line in Buffalo Grove, Illinois to assemble the machines; jokingly, the machines were given Aperture Science branding, the fictional company from Valve's Portal series.

== Vendor support ==
Selected manufacturers showcased prototype units prior to the 2014 CES show. iBuyPower announced a prototype model, powered by an AMD CPU with a discrete R9-270 GPU and a 500 GB hard drive with a price of $499. Digital Storm also revealed its higher-end unit utilizing liquid-cooled parts, expected to retail from about $1,500. Other vendors with Steam Machine prototypes include Alienware, Falcon Northwest, CyberPowerPC, Origin PC, Gigabyte, Materiel.net, Webhallen, Alternate, Next, Zotac, Scan Computers, and Maingear, all of whom, except Maingear, showcased their prototypes at the 2014 CES show. The price range of these first machines ranged from $499 to $6,000 based on vendor and specifications.

Alienware announced it would start selling consumer Steam Machines in September. The company planned to offer only fixed hardware units that cannot be modified by the user, but plan on offering new configurations on an annual basis. The initial units, called Alpha, did not initially ship with SteamOS, as the operating system was not ready in time. Owners were able to upgrade their units to SteamOS once it was officially released. On the official release of Steam Machines in November 2015, both Falcon Northwest and Origin PC opted to not ship a SteamOS-enabled machine in 2015 due to limitations of SteamOS over Windows; Falcon Northwest said they would consider shipping machines with SteamOS in the future if performance improved. Valve negotiated deals with retail stores GameStop, EB Games and Game to create Steam Sections within the stores where various Steam Machines, the Steam Controller and Link, and pre-paid Steam cards would be sold.

== Software ==
=== SteamOS ===
Steam Machines ran, at minimum, SteamOS, a Linux-based operating system derived from Debian that expands the Steam client to add functionality such as media sharing, media services, Steam In-Home Streaming, family sharing, and parental controls. The operating system is freely available for any user to install on their own hardware, assuming it meets the system requirements. As part of SteamOS, Valve developed Proton (after the original Steam Machines had already came off sale), a Linux compatibility layer that would allow SteamOS-based computers run most Windows-based games, eliminating the need for developers to build Linux-native versions of their games.

=== Games and applications ===
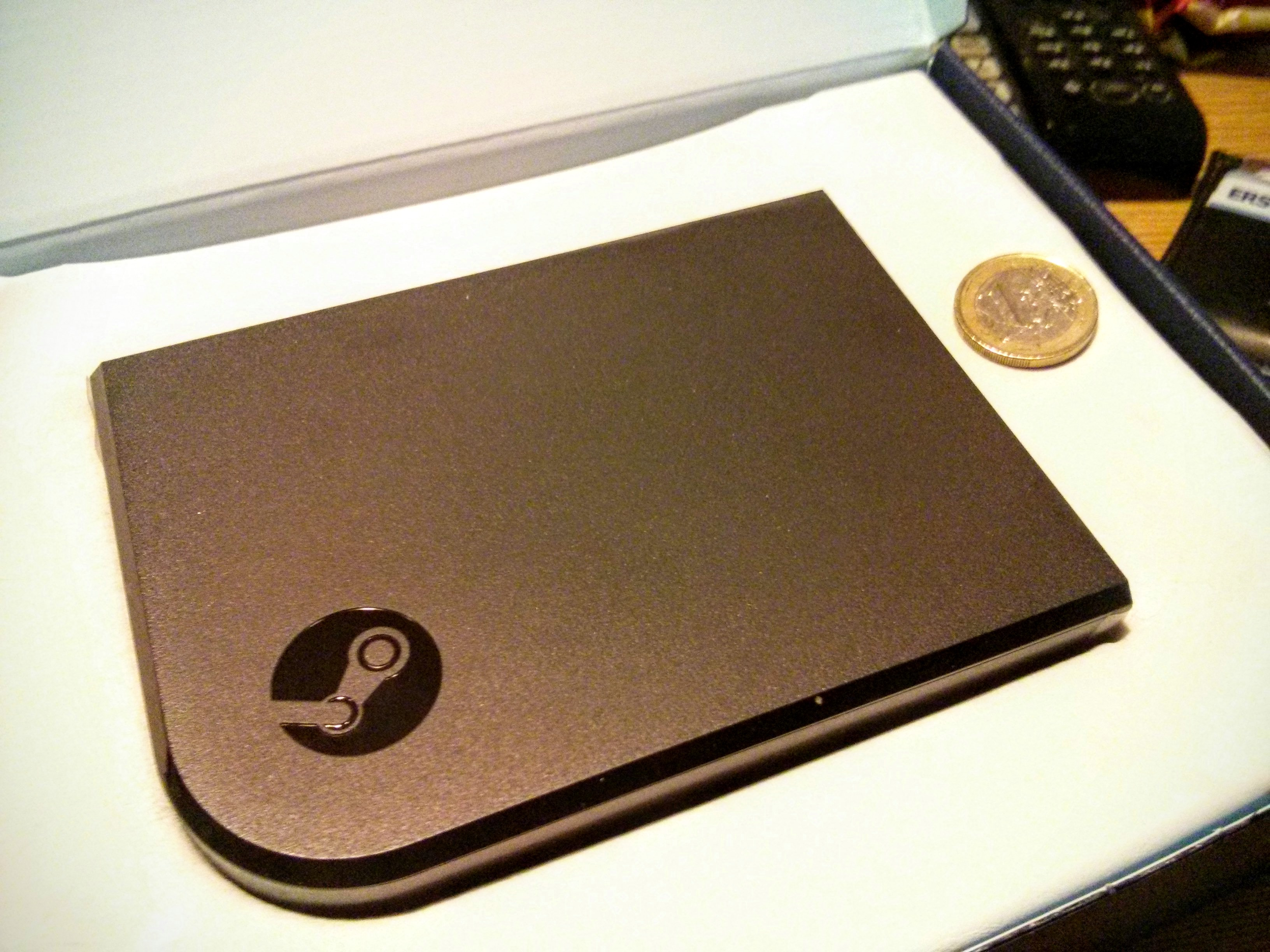
Steam Link with one-euro coin for scale

Linux compatibility is already a feature offered through the Steamworks application programming interface (API), and many games that have been designed to work with Steam under Linux will also run under SteamOS without additional modifications. Valve will not make games that are exclusive to SteamOS and has cautioned third-party developers against making games exclusive to the platform. However, Valve will not stop developers from making SteamOS-exclusive games, particularly those that are best suited for playing from the living room. Players will also be able to stream games from regular PCs running Steam to Steam Machines, allowing access to games that are only available for Windows or macOS/OS X. Through Steam Play, users can play games available on SteamOS that they already own on Windows or OS X and will not need to repurchase the title. Also, games running on a Steam Machine can be streamed to a Steam Link device via a wireless LAN connection.

== Reception ==
By June 2016, seven months after the official release, fewer than half a million units had been sold. In response to the sales figures, Ars Technica described the unit as dead on arrival. Many vendors discontinued selling Steam Machines by the end of 2016; however, as of 2017, some were still offering them for sale, alongside configurations that could be installed with SteamOS.

In an article published in July 2017, PC Gamer lists several factors why Steam Machines did not take off as Valve had anticipated. SteamOS itself was not seen as ready for everyday use or gameplay in its initial builds, and Valve has been unresponsive at times towards Steam Machine makers to release updates, while concurrently, Microsoft had announced its free rollout of Windows 10, making that an incentive over Valve's software. Valve also had delayed the Steam Controller release to 2015, which also subsequently delayed the Steam Machine release. Further, the Steam Machine makers felt that the Steam Link, produced by Valve, competed with concept of Steam Machines and was a much more cost-attractive product. In most cases the Steam Machine vendors simply found that there was not as great a market for the product, since it was trying to bridge consoles and home computers, while they found most consumers would flock to one extreme or the other. In March 2020, Newell said "the [Steam Machine] hardware we were pushing for was super-incomplete at the time." Gabe Newell noted that Steam Machines impacted Valve's design for the Valve Index and Half-Life: Alyx, which, like the Steam Machine and SteamOS, were intended to be "hardware and software in concert with each other."

Following discontinuing the Steam Machine line, Valve identified two primary issues with its approach: they did not build out a base model to be used as reference for the other manufacturer, and it was difficult to get developers to convert games for Linux. The latter issue was addressed by developing the Proton emulation layer that allowed most Windows games to work on Linux without modification in addition to Linux-native games. With this, the company developed the Steam Deck, a handheld Linux-based computer using SteamOS and Proton manufactured by Valve themselves, and released in 2022. The Steam Deck was considered a success over the original Steam Machine, and led to developing the updated Steam Machine, released in 2026, also manufactured by Valve and using SteamOS and Proton.
