= Active Shooter =

2018 video game

- Developer: Revived Games
- Publisher: Acid Publishing Group
- Designer: Anton Makarevskiy
- Engine: Unity
- Platform: Microsoft Windows
- Release: 2018
- Genre: First-person shooter
- Modes: Single-player, multiplayer

Active Shooter is a first-person shooter video game depicting a school shooting, developed by Russian video game developer Anton Makarevskiy and publisher Ata Berdyev, working under the names Revived Games and Acid Publishing Group. It was first scheduled for release on June 6, 2018, through the Steam distribution platform. After Valve removed the publisher from the platform, the developer released the game independently as an early access title.

== Gameplay ==
The game depicts a school shooting, and allows players to take the role of either the active shooter (referred as the "attacker" on the title screen), a SWAT member responding to the event, or a civilian who can choose to flee the shooting or fight the shooter. In the attacker role, the players can choose to attack with guns, grenades, or knives, and the number of civilian, guard, and police deaths are tallied on screen.

== Controversy ==
Active Shooter attracted controversy after its Steam store page was published in May 2018, with parents of Stoneman Douglas High School shooting victims campaigning against the game online. An online petition had attracted 100,000 signatures by the time of the game's cancellation.

On May 29, it emerged that Revived Games and Acid Publishing Group were the trading names of Anton Makarevskiy and Ata Berdyev, the latter of which had previously been removed from Steam by Valve for copyright infringement after the publication of a Rick and Morty parody called Piccled Ricc. The company later announced that Revived Games and Acid Publishing Group would be removed from the Steam platform. A spokesperson told Matthew Gault of Motherboard that Berdyev is "a troll, with a history of customer abuse, publishing copyrighted material, and user review manipulation". In a subsequent blog post, Acid Software argued that Steam had carried other video games with a focus on violence and murder, giving examples of Hatred, Postal, and Carmageddon.

Following the media reaction to the game, Valve suggested a broader review of its content policies would take place "soon". Valve issued this updated policy on June 6, 2018, which stated that they would allow any content on Steam as long as it was not illegal, or if the content was "trolling". Valve's Doug Lombardi used Active Shooter as an example of such trolling, in that the game was "designed to do nothing but generate outrage and cause conflict through its existence", and even if another developer, without the history of abusing Steam as they found with Berdyev, had released the same title, they still would have removed it for its trolling nature.

Later in June 2018, PayPal closed the account of Acid Software, citing that the game violated their Acceptable Use Policy. Indiegogo also dropped the title from their service near the same time. The developers' websites for the game were shut down by Bluehost following a Sandy Hook Promise petition.
