= Steam (service) =

Video game distribution platform

- The Steam storefront as of November 2025
- Developer: Valve
- Release: September 12, 2003; 23 years ago
- Platform: Windows; macOS; Linux; iOS; Android
- Available in: 29 languages
- List of languages English, Bulgarian, Chinese (Simplified and Traditional), Czech, Danish, Dutch, Finnish, French, Greek, German, Hungarian, Indonesian, Italian, Japanese, Korean, Norwegian, Polish, Portuguese (European and Brazilian), Russian, Romanian, Spanish (European and Latin American), Swedish, Thai, Turkish, Ukrainian, Vietnamese
- Type: Content delivery; Digital rights management; Social network service; Video streaming service
- License: Proprietary
- Website: store.steampowered.com

Steam is a digital distribution platform for PC games by the American video game studio Valve. It was launched as a software client in September 2003 to provide video game updates automatically for Valve's games and expanded to distributing third-party titles in late 2005. Steam offers various features, such as game server matchmaking with Valve Anti-Cheat (VAC) measures, social networking, and game streaming services. The Steam client functions include update maintenance, cloud storage, and community features such as direct messaging, an in-game overlay, discussion forums, and a virtual collectable marketplace. The storefront also offers productivity software, game soundtracks, videos, and sells hardware made by Valve, such as the Valve Index and the Steam Deck.

Steamworks, an application programming interface (API) released in 2008, is used by developers to integrate Steam's functions, including digital rights management (DRM), into their products. Several game publishers began distributing their products on Steam that year. Initially developed for Windows, Steam was ported to macOS and Linux in 2010 and 2013 respectively, while a mobile version of Steam for interacting with the service's online features was released on iOS and Android in 2012.

As of 2013, the service was the largest PC game distribution platform with an estimated 75% of the market share. By 2017, game purchases through Steam totaled about US$4.3 billion, or at least 18% of global PC game sales according to Steam Spy. By 2021, the service had over 34,000 games with over 132 million monthly active users. Steam's success has led to the development of SteamOS, a Linux-based operating system and the Proton compatibility layer to allow most Windows games to play on SteamOS without modification. SteamOS served as the basis for Valve's concept of Steam Machines gaming PCs in 2015, and later the Steam Deck handheld computer in 2022 and the second iteration of Valve's Steam Machine in 2026.

== History ==
Steam releases and updates
2002	Beta release
2003	Official release
2004
2005	First publisher partnership
2006
2007	Steam Community
2008	Steamworks
2008	Matchmaking services
2009	Steam Cloud
2010	Mac OS X client
2011	Steam Workshop
2012	Steam online mobile apps
2012	Steam for Schools
2012	Steam Greenlight
2012	Big Picture Mode
2012	Non-gaming software added to marketplace
2012	Steam Community Market
2013	Steam Trading Cards
2013	Linux client
2013	Family Sharing
2013	Steam Early Access
2014	In-Home Streaming
2014	Steam Music
2015	SteamOS
2015	Steam Machines
2015	Films added to marketplace
2015	Steam Link
2015	Steam Controller (1st generation)
2016	SteamVR
2016	Steam Awards
2017	Steam Direct
2018	Steam.tv
2018	Proton
2019	Remote Play
2019	Steam Labs
2020	Steam Cloud Play
2021	Steam China
2022	Steam Deck
2023
2024	Steam Families
2024	Game Recording
2025
2026	Steam Controller
2026	Steam Machine
2026	Steam Frame

In the early 2000s, Valve was looking for a better way to update its published games, as providing downloadable patches for multiplayer games resulted in most users disconnecting for several days until they had installed the patch. They decided to create a platform that would update games automatically, and implement stronger anti-piracy and anti-cheat measures. They approached several companies, including Microsoft, Yahoo!, and RealNetworks, to build a client with these features, but were rejected.

Valve began its own platform development in 2002, using the working names "Grid" and "Gazelle". The Steam platform was announced at the Game Developers Conference event on March 22, 2002, and released for beta testing that day. Prior to the implementation of Steam, Valve had a publishing contract with Sierra Studios; the 2001 version of the contract gave Valve rights to digital distribution of its games. Valve took Sierra and its owners, Vivendi Games, to court in 2002 over a claimed breach of contract. Sierra counter-sued, asserting that Valve had undermined the contract by offering a digital storefront for their games, to compete directly with Sierra.

Steam was released out of beta on September 12, 2003. In November 2004, Half-Life 2 was the first high-profile game to be offered digitally on Steam, requiring installation of the Steam client for retail copies. During this time users faced problems attempting to play; part of legal issues that Valve had with Vivendi, who claimed that physical copies it published could not be activated as to it the game had not been released. The Steam requirement was met with concerns about software ownership and requirements, as well as problems with overloaded servers - demonstrated previously by the Counter-Strike rollout.

In 2005, third-party developers were contracted to release games on Steam, such as Rag Doll Kung Fu and Darwinia. In May 2007, ATI included Steam in the ATI Catalyst GPU driver as well as offering a free Steam copy of Half-Life 2: Lost Coast and Half-Life 2: Deathmatch to ATI Radeon owners.

In January 2008, Nvidia promoted Steam in the GeForce GPU driver, as well as offering a free Steam copy of Portal: The First Slice to Nvidia hardware owners. In 2011, some Electronic Arts (EA) games, such as Crysis 2, Dragon Age II, and Alice: Madness Returns, were removed from sale because of Steam's terms of service that prevented EA having its own in-game storefront for downloadable content. These were later launched on EA's Origin service.

In 2019, Ubisoft announced that it would stop selling future games on Steam, starting with Tom Clancy's The Division 2 because Valve would not modify its revenue sharing model. In May 2019, Microsoft distributed its games on Steam in addition to the Microsoft Store.

In 2020, Electronic Arts started to publish selected games on Steam, and offered its rebranded subscription service EA Play on the platform. In 2022, Ubisoft announced that it would return to selling its recent games on Steam, starting with Assassin's Creed Valhalla, stating that it was "constantly evaluating how to bring our games to different audiences wherever they are".

By 2014, total annual game sales on Steam were estimated at $1.5 billion. By 2018, the service had over 90 million monthly active users. In 2018, its network delivered 15 billion gigabytes of data, compared to less than 4 billion in 2014.

== Features and functionality ==
=== Software delivery and maintenance ===
Steam's primary purpose is to allow its users to purchase games and other software, and then adding them to a virtual library from which they may be downloaded and installed an unlimited number of times. Initially, Valve was required to be the publisher for these games since it had sole access to Steam's database and engine, but with the introduction of the Steamworks software development kit (SDK) in May 2008, anyone could integrate Steam into their game without Valve's direct involvement.

With Steam, Valve wanted to make digital rights management (DRM) "obsolete" as games released on Steam had traditional anti-piracy measures, including the assignment and distribution of product keys. With an update to the Steamworks SDK in March 2009, Valve added "Custom Executable Generation" (CEG), which creates a unique, encrypted copy of the game's executable files for the given user, which allows them to install it multiple times and on multiple devices, and make backup copies of their software. Once the software is downloaded and installed, the user must then authenticate through Steam to de-encrypt the executable files to play the game. Normally this is done while connected to the Internet following the user's credential validation, but once they have logged into Steam once, a user can instruct Steam to launch in a special offline mode to be able to play their games without a network connection. Developers are not limited to Steam's CEG and may include other forms of DRM (or none at all) and other authentication services than Steam; for example, some games from publisher Ubisoft require the use of its Uplay gaming service.

In September 2008, Valve added support for Steam Cloud, a service that can automatically store saved game and related custom files on Valve's servers; users can access this data from any machine running the Steam client. Users can disable this feature on a per-game and per-account basis. Cloud saving was expanded in January 2022 for Dynamic Cloud Sync, allowing games developed with the feature to store saved states to Steam Cloud while a game is running rather than waiting until the user quit; this was added ahead of the portable Steam Deck unit so that users can save from the Deck and then put the unit into a suspended state. In May 2012, the service added the ability for users to manage their game libraries from remote clients, including computers and mobile devices. Product keys sold through third-party retailers can also be redeemed on Steam. For games that incorporate Steamworks, users can buy redemption codes from other vendors and redeem these in the Steam client to add the title to their libraries. Steam also offers a framework for selling and distributing downloadable content (DLC) for games.

In September 2013, Steam introduced the ability to share most games with family members and close friends by authorizing machines to access one's library. Authorized players can install the game locally and play it separately from the owning account. Users can access their saved games and achievements provided the main owner is not playing. When the main player initiates a game while a shared account is using it, the shared account user is allowed a few minutes to either save their progress and close the game or purchase the game for their own account. Within Family View, introduced in January 2014, parents can adjust settings for their children's tied accounts, limiting the functionality and accessibility to the Steam client and purchased games. A more robust implementation of Family Sharing, titled "Steam Families", was released in September 2024, allowing up to six users to share games from a single account, including the ability to play different games on those accounts along with different game saves and profiles, and enhanced parental control tools for those accounts.

By its acceptable use policy, Valve retains the right to block customers' access to their games and Steam services when Valve's Anti-Cheat (VAC) software determines that the user is cheating in multiplayer games, selling accounts to others, or trading games to exploit regional price differences. Blocking such users initially removed access to their other games, leading to some users with high-value accounts losing access because of minor infractions. Valve later changed its policy to be similar to that of Electronic Arts' Origin platform, in which blocked users can still access their games but are heavily restricted, limited to playing in offline mode and unable to participate in Steam Community features. Customers also lose access to their games and Steam account if they refuse to accept changes to Steam's end user license agreements; this last occurred in August 2012. In April 2015, Valve began allowing developers to set bans on players for their games, but enacted and enforced at the Steam level, which allowed them to police their own gaming communities in a customizable manner.

=== Storefront features ===
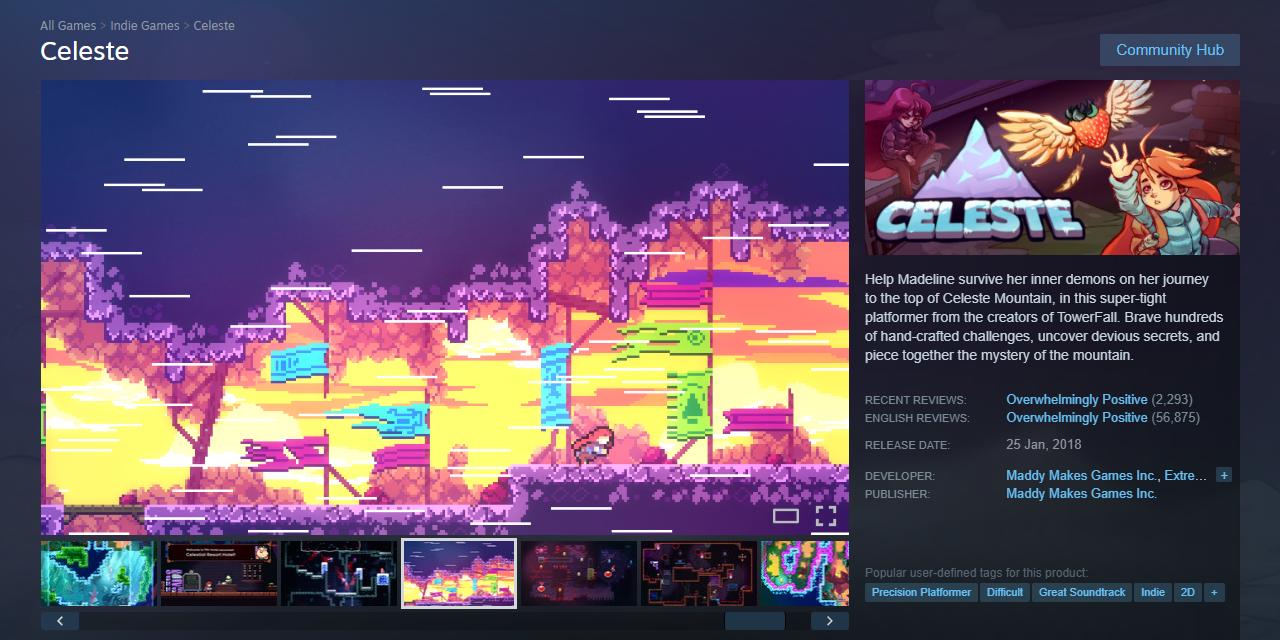
Celeste on Steam; the store page shows the game's description, screenshots, user rating and user-defined tags.

The Steam client includes a digital storefront called the Steam Store through which users can purchase games. Once the game is bought, a software license is permanently attached to the user's Steam account, allowing them to download the software on any compatible device. Game licenses can be given to other accounts under certain conditions. Content is delivered from an international network of servers using a proprietary file transfer protocol. Products sold on Steam are available for sale in different currencies, which changes depending on the user's location. In December 2010, the storefront began supporting WebMoney for payments, and from April 2016 until December 2017 supported Bitcoin payments before dropping support due to high value fluctuations and costly service fees. The Steam storefront validates the user's region; the purchase of games may be restricted to specific regions because of release dates, game classification, or agreements with publishers. Since 2010, the Steam Translation Server project allowed users to assist with the translation of the Steam client, storefront, and a selected library of Steam games for several languages. In October 2018, official support for Vietnamese and Latin American Spanish was added, in addition to Steam's then 26 languages. Steam also allows users to purchase downloadable content for games, and for some specific games such as Team Fortress 2, the ability to purchase in-game inventory items. In February 2015, Steam began to open similar options for in-game item purchases for third-party games. Game achievements similar to Xbox and PlayStation trophies were added in November 2007.

In conjunction with developers and publishers, Valve frequently provides discounted sales on games on a daily and weekly basis, sometimes oriented around a publisher, genre, or holiday theme, and sometimes allows games to be tried for free during the days of these sales. The site normally offers a large selection of games at a discount during its annual Summer and Holiday sales, including gamification of these sales. Since 2016, Steam held a sale for the Lunar New Year (sometimes referred to as Chinese New Year by Valve) that is observed in some Asian countries. This sale was sometimes not held due to close proximity with the Spring Sale.

Users of Steam's storefront can also purchase games and other software as gifts for another Steam user. Before May 2017, users could purchase these gifts to be held in their profile's inventory until they opted to gift them. However, this feature enabled a gray market around some games, where a user in a country where the price of a game was substantially lower than elsewhere could stockpile giftable copies to sell to others in regions with much higher prices. In August 2016, Valve changed its gifting policy to require that games with VAC and Game Ban-enabled games be gifted immediately to another Steam user, which also served to combat players that worked around VAC and Game Bans; in May 2017, Valve expanded this policy to all games. The changes also placed limitations on gifts between users of different countries if there is a large difference in pricing. Due to runaway inflation in Argentina and Turkey, Valve eliminated the use of local currency pricing for users in those storefronts in November 2023, instead moving them to a special regional pricing model based on U.S. dollars as a means to provide fair payments to publisher and developers, though these local users saw effective price hikes as high as 2900%. Steam revamped its gifting process in July 2026, allowing a user to pay for a gift to a user in a different region with the gift priced by the receiver's country. The new system also allowed non-Steam users to purchase gifts in a similar manner.

The Steam store also enables users to redeem store product keys to add software from their library. The keys are sold by third-party providers such as Humble Bundle, distributed as part of a physical release, or given to a user as part of promotions, often used to deliver Kickstarter and other crowdfunding rewards. A grey market exists around Steam keys, where less reputable buyers purchase a large number of Steam keys for a game when it is offered for a low cost, and then resell these keys to users or other third-party sites at a higher price. This caused some of these third-party sites, such as G2A, to be embroiled in this grey market. It is possible for publishers to have Valve track down where specific keys have been used and cancel them, removing the product from the user's libraries. Other legitimate storefronts, like Humble Bundle, have set a minimum price that must be spent to obtain Steam keys as to discourage mass purchases. In June 2021, Valve began limiting how frequently Steam users could change their default region to prevent them from purchasing games from outside their home region for cheaper.

In 2013, Steam began to accept player reviews of games. Other users can subsequently rate these reviews as helpful, humorous, or otherwise unhelpful, which are then used to highlight the most useful reviews on the game's Steam store page. Steam also aggregates these reviews and enables users to sort products based on this feedback while browsing the store. In May 2016, Steam further broke out these aggregations between all reviews overall and those made more recently in the last 30 days, a change Valve acknowledges to how game updates, particularly those in Early Access, can alter the impression of a game to users. To prevent observed abuse of the review system by developers or other third-party agents, Valve modified the review system in September 2016 to discount review scores for a game from users that activated the product through a product key rather than directly purchased by the Steam Store, though their reviews remain visible. Alongside this, Valve announced that it would end business relations with any developer or publisher that it found to be abusing the review system. Separately, Valve has taken actions to minimize the effects of review bombs on Steam. In particular, Valve announced in March 2019 that it marks reviews it believes are "off-topic" as a result of a review bomb, and eliminate their contribution to summary review scores; the first such games it took action on with this were the Borderlands games after it was announced Borderlands 3 would be a timed-exclusive to the Epic Games Store. In August 2025, Valve released the ability to filter reviews between languages. This was intended for users to get more accurate review scores based on their nationality, as poor localizations and other regional- or language-based differences can drastically affect reviews. In February 2014, user-defined tags for games were added to Steam.

Valve added support for free-to-play games on Steam as well as support for in-game microtransactions through the use of Steamworks in June 2011, while support was added in September 2011 for trading in-game items and "unopened" gifts between users. Steam Coupons, which was introduced in December 2011, provides single-use coupons that provide a discount to the cost of items. Steam Coupons can be provided to users by developers and publishers; users can trade these coupons between friends in a similar fashion to gifts and in-game items. In May 2015, GameStop began selling Steam Wallet cards. Steam Market, a feature introduced in beta in December 2012 that would allow users to sell virtual items to others via Steam Wallet funds, further extended the idea. Valve levies a transaction fee of 15% on such sales and game publishers that use Steam Market pay a transaction fee. For example, Team Fortress 2—the first game supported at the beta phase—incurred both fees. Full support for other games was expected to be available in early 2013. In April 2013, Valve added subscription-based game support to Steam; the first game to use this service was Darkfall Unholy Wars. Valve discontinued physical Steam gift cards in June 2026 due to the capability of scammers to abuse these.

In October 2012, Steam introduced non-gaming applications, which are sold through the service in the same manner as games. Creativity and productivity applications can access the core functions of the Steamworks API, allowing them to use Steam's simplified installation and updating process, and incorporate features including cloud saving and Steam Workshop. Steam also allows game soundtracks to be purchased to be played via Steam Music or integrated with the user's other media players. Valve adjusted its approach to soundtracks in 2020, no longer requiring them to be offered as DLC, meaning that users can buy soundtracks to games they do not own, and publishers can offer soundtracks to games not on Steam.

From 2015 to 2019, Steam had the ability for publishers to rent and sell digital movies via the service, with initially most being video game documentaries. Following Warner Bros. Entertainment offering the Mad Max films alongside the September 2015 release of the game based on the series, Lionsgate entered into agreement with Valve to rent over one hundred feature films from its catalog through Steam starting in April 2016, with more films following later. In March 2017, Crunchyroll started offering various anime for purchase or rent through Steam. However, by February 2019, Valve shuttered its video storefront save for videos directly related to gaming content. While available, users could also purchase Steam Machine related hardware.

Valve took a flat 30% share of all revenue generated from direct Steam sales and microtransactions (Note: Valve does not receive any cut of sales from third-party key resellers and brick-and-mortar retailers.) until October 2018 when it changed its policy to reduce the cut to 25% once revenue for a game surpasses US$10 million, and further to 20% at US$50 million. The policy change was seen by journalists as trying to entice larger developers to stay with Steam, while the decision was also met with backlash from indie and other small game developers, as their revenue split remained unchanged.

While Steam allows developers to offer demo versions of their games at any time, Valve worked with Geoff Keighley in 2019 in conjunction with The Game Awards to hold a week-long Steam Game Festival to feature a large selection of game demos of current and upcoming games, alongside sales for games already released. This event has since been repeated two or three times a year, typically in conjunction with game expositions or award events, and since has been renamed as the Steam Next Fest. Valve expanded support for demo versions of games in July 2024, allowing demos to have their own store page with user reviews and made it easier for user to manage demos within their game library.

A Steam Points system and storefront was added in June 2020, which mirrored similar temporary points systems that had been used in prior sales on the storefront. Initially, users earned points through purchases on Steam or by receiving community recognition for helpful reviews or discussion comments. These points can be redeemed in the separate storefront for cosmetics that apply to the user's profile and chat interface. In January 2026, Steam overhauled the points system, changing community rewards and deleting the famous "Clown" reward, together with removing the ability to earn points through rewards on content, in order to prevent users from profiting from provocative comments.

=== Privacy, security and abuse ===
The popularity of Steam has led to it being attacked by hackers. An attempt occurred in November 2011, when Valve temporarily closed the community forums, citing potential hacking threats to the service. Days later, Valve reported that the hack had compromised one of its customer databases, potentially allowing the perpetrators to access customer information, including encrypted passwords and credit card details. At that time, Valve was not aware whether the intruders actually accessed this information or discovered the encryption method, but nevertheless warned users to be alert for fraudulent activity.

Valve launched Steam Guard in March 2011 with the goal of protecting Steam users against account hijacking via phishing schemes, one of the largest security problems Valve had at the time. Steam Guard was advertised to take advantage of the identity protection provided by Intel's second-generation Core processors and compatible motherboard hardware, which allows users to lock their account to a specific computer. Once locked, activity by that account on other computers must first be approved by the user on the locked computer. Support APIs for Steam Guard are available to third-party developers through Steamworks. Steam Guard also offers two-factor, risk-based authentication that uses a one-time verification code sent to a verified email address associated with the Steam account; this was later expanded to include two-factor authentication through the Steam mobile application, known as Steam Guard Mobile Authenticator.

In 2015, Valve stated that the potential monetary value of virtual goods attached to user accounts had drawn hackers to try to access accounts for financial benefit. Valve reported that in December 2015, around 77,000 accounts per month were hijacked, enabling the hijackers to empty the user's inventory of items through the trading features. To improve security, the company announced that new restrictions would be added in March 2016, under which 15-day holds are placed on traded items unless they activate, and authenticate with Steam Guard Mobile Authenticator. After a Counter-Strike: Global Offensive gambling controversy, Valve stated it was cracking down on third-party websites using Steam inventory trading for skin gambling in July 2016.

ReVuln, a commercial vulnerability research firm, published a paper in October 2012 that said the Steam browser protocol was posing a security risk by enabling malicious exploits through a simple user click on a maliciously crafted steam:// URL in a browser. This was the second serious vulnerability of gaming-related software following a problem with Ubisoft's Uplay. German IT platform Heise online recommended strict separation of gaming and sensitive data, for example using a PC dedicated to gaming, gaming from a second Windows installation, or using a computer account with limited rights dedicated to gaming.

In July 2015, a bug in the software allowed anyone to reset the password to any account by using the "forgot password" function of the client. High-profile professional gamers and streamers lost access to their accounts. In December 2015, Steam's content delivery network was misconfigured in response to a DDoS attack, causing cached store pages containing personal information to be temporarily exposed for 34,000 users.

Valve added new privacy settings to Steam in April 2018, allowing users to hide their activity status, game lists, inventory, and other profile elements. While these changes brought Steam's privacy settings in line with services such as PlayStation Network and the Xbox network, third-party services such as Steam Spy were impacted, due to their reliance on public data to estimate Steam product sales.

Valve established a HackerOne bug bounty program in May 2018, a crowdsourced method to test and improve the security features of the Steam client. In August 2019, a security researcher exposed a zero-day vulnerability in the Windows client of Steam, which allowed for any user to run arbitrary code with LocalSystem privileges using just a few simple commands. The vulnerability was then reported to Valve via the program, but it was initially rejected for being "out-of-scope". Following a second vulnerability found by the same user, Valve apologized and patched them both, and expanded the program's rules to accept any other similar problems.

In April 2020, the Anti-Defamation League published a report that stated the Steam Community platform harbors hateful content. In January 2021, a trading card glitch let players generate Steam Wallet funds from free Steam trading cards with bots using Capcom Arcade Stadium and other games, resulting in the game becoming one of the statistically most played titles.

On August 30, 2025, an update was pushed to the game BlockBlasters on Steam that contained malware. By the time Valve realized what happened, in September, the game had already stolen thousands of dollars from users, including a streamer who had been holding a fundraiser for his battle with cancer. Valve quickly removed the update and encouraged users who had launched the game to run a full virus scan, so as to remove any remaining malware. Earlier the same year, in February 2025, another Steam game, PirateFi, also distributed malware.

=== User interface and functionality ===
Since November 2013, Steam has allowed for users to review their purchased games and organize them into categories set by the user and add to favorite lists for quick access. Players can add non-Steam games to their libraries, allowing the game to be easily accessed from the Steam client and providing support where possible for Steam Overlay features. The Steam interface allows for user-defined shortcuts to be added. In this way, third-party modifications and games not purchased through the Steam Store can use Steam features. Valve sponsors and distributes some modifications free of charge; and modifications that use Steamworks can also use any Steam features supported by their parent game. For most games launched from Steam, the client provides an in-game overlay from which the user can access Steam Community lists and participate in chat, manage selected Steam settings, and access a built-in web browser without having to exit the game. Beginning in February 2011 in the beta version of the feature, the overlay also allows players to take screenshots of the games in process. In the full version, released on February 24, 2011, the feature was reimplemented so that users could share screenshots on websites of Facebook, Twitter, and Reddit directly from a user's screenshot manager. Store game pages display a score from Metacritic since 2007.

==== Big Picture ====
Steam's "Big Picture" mode is more optimized for a larger screen with a larger, simpler interface that mimics the Steam Deck interface and is easily navigable with either a controller or mouse.

Steam's "Big Picture" mode was announced in 2011; public betas started in September 2012, and it was launched worldwide in December 2012. Big Picture mode is a 10-foot user interface which optimizes the Steam display to work on high-definition televisions, allowing the user to control Steam with a gamepad or with a keyboard and mouse. Gabe Newell stated that Big Picture mode was a step towards a dedicated Steam entertainment hardware unit. With the introduction of the Steam Deck, Valve began pushing the new Big Picture mode based on the Steam Deck UI in beta testing in October 2022, and full release in February 2023. The new UI was also adopted by SteamVR in October 2023.

In 2012, Valve announced Steam for Schools, a free function-limited version of the Steam client for schools. It was part of Valve's initiative to support the gamification of learning. It was released alongside free versions of Portal 2 and a standalone program called "Puzzle Maker" that allowed teachers and students to create and manipulate levels. It featured additional authentication security that allowed teachers to share and distribute content via a Steam Workshop-type interface but blocks access from students.

In-Home Streaming was introduced in May 2014; it allows users to stream games installed on one computer to another on the same home network with low latency. By June 2019, Valve renamed this feature to Remote Play, allowing users to stream games across devices that may be outside of their home network. Steam's "Remote Play Together", added in November 2019 after a month of beta testing, gives the ability for local multiplayer games to be played by people in disparate locations, though will not necessary resolve latency problems typical of these types of games. Remote Play Together was expanded in February 2021 to give the ability to invite non-Steam players to play through a Steam Link app approach.

The Steam client, as part of a social network service, allows users to identify friends and join groups using the Steam Community feature. Through the Steam Chat feature, users can use text chat and peer-to-peer VoIP with other users, identify which games their friends and other group members are playing, and join and invite friends to Steamworks-based multiplayer games that support this feature. Users can participate in forums hosted by Valve to discuss Steam games. Each user has a unique page that shows his or her groups and friends, game library including earned achievements, game wishlists, and other social features; users can choose to keep this information private. In January 2010, Valve reported that 10 million of the 25 million active Steam accounts had signed up to Steam Community. In conjunction with the 2012 Steam Summer Sale, user profiles were updated with Badges reflecting the user's participation in the Steam community and past events. Steam Trading Cards, a system where players earn virtual trading cards based on games they own, were introduced in May 2013. Using them, players can trade with other Steam users on the Steam Community Marketplace and use them to craft "Badges", which grant rewards such as discount coupons, and user profile page customization options. In 2010, the Steam client became an OpenID provider, allowing third-party websites to use a Steam user's identity without requiring the user to expose his or her Steam credentials. In order to prevent abuse, access to most community features is restricted until a one-time payment of at least US$5 is made to Valve. This requirement can be fulfilled by making any purchase of five dollars or more on Steam, or by adding at the same amount to their wallet.

Through Steamworks, Steam provides a means of server browsing for multiplayer games that use the Steam Community features, allowing users to create lobbies with friends or members of common groups. Steamworks also provides Valve Anti-Cheat (VAC), Valve's anti-cheat system; game servers automatically detect and report users who are using cheats in online, multiplayer games. In August 2012, Valve added new features—including dedicated hub pages for games that highlight the best user-created content, top forum posts, and screenshots—to the Community area. In December 2012, a feature where users can upload walkthroughs and guides detailing game strategy was added. Starting in January 2015, the Steam client allowed players to livestream to Steam friends or the public while playing games on the platform. For the main event of The International 2018 Dota 2 tournament, Valve launched Steam.tv as a major update to Steam Broadcasting, adding Steam Chat and Steamworks integration for spectating matches played at the event. It has also been used for other events, such as a pre-release tournament for the digital card game Artifact and for The Game Awards 2018 and Steam Awards award shows. Game Recording was added in beta in June 2024 and released in full by November 2024, allowing for recording of gameplay sessions both on demand or as a background recording. Users can then edit and clip footage to share via Steam with other users.

In September 2014, Steam Music was added to the Steam client, allowing users to play through music stored on their computer or to stream from a locally networked computer directly in Steam. An update to the friends and chat system was released in July 2018, allowing for non-peer-to-peer chats integrated with voice chat and other features that were compared to Discord. A standalone mobile app based on this for Android and iOS was released in May 2019.

A major visual overhaul of the Library was released in October 2019, with the goal of aiding users in organizing their games and helping to showcase what shared games a user's friends are playing, games that are being live-streamed, and new content that may be available, along with more customization options for sorting games. Along with the redesign, Valve launched Steam Events, allowing game developers to communicate when new in-game events are approaching, which appear to players in the Library and game listings.

In June 2023, a visual and architectural overhaul was released, unifying the backend functions of the Steam and Steam Deck clients and redesigning the desktop client. As part of this, the in-game overlay received a new customizable design where users can pin windows such as chat or game guides on top of the current game window. It also received several new features, including the ability to create pinnable personal notes stored in the cloud.

=== Developer features ===
Valve provides developers the ability to create storefront pages to help generate interest in their game ahead of release. This is also necessary to fix a release date that functions into Valve's "build review", a free service performed by Valve about a week before this release date to make sure the game's launch is trouble-free. Updates in 2020 to Discovery queues have given developers more options for customizing their storefront page and how these pages integrate with users' experiences with the Steam client.

Valve offers Steamworks, an application programming interface (API) that provides development and publishing tools free of charge to game and software developers. Steamworks provides networking and player authentication tools for both server and peer-to-peer multiplayer games, matchmaking services, support for Steam community friends and groups, Steam statistics and achievements, integrated voice communications, and Steam Cloud support, allowing games to integrate with the Steam client. The API also provides anti-cheating devices and digital copy management. In 2016, after introducing the Steam Controller and improvements to the Steam interface to support numerous customization options, the Steamworks API was also updated to provide a generic controller library for developers and these customization features for other third-party controllers, starting with the DualShock 4. Steam's Input API has since been updated to include official support for other console controllers such as the Nintendo Switch Pro Controller in 2018, the Xbox Wireless Controller for the Xbox Series X and Series S consoles, and the PlayStation 5's DualSense, as well as compatible controllers from third-party manufacturers in 2020. In November 2020, Valve said the controller usage had more than doubled over the past 2 years. In March 2019, Steam's game server network was opened to third-party developers.

Developers of software available on Steam can track sales of their games through the Steam store. In February 2014, Valve announced that it would begin to allow developers to set up their own sales for their games independent of any sales that Valve may set. Valve may also work with developers to suggest their participation in sales on themed days.

Steam has conducted and partially published a monthly opt-in hardware survey since 2007. Data on installed software began to be collected in 2010.

Valve added the ability for developers to sell games under an early access model with a special section of the Steam store, starting in March 2013. This program allows developers to release functional, but not finished, products such as beta versions to the service to allow users to buy the games and help provide testing and feedback towards the final production. Early access also helps to provide funding to the developers to help complete their games. The early access approach allowed more developers to publish games onto the Steam service without the need for Valve's direct curation of games, significantly increasing the number of available games on the service. Valve added Steam Playtest for developers in 2020, allowing them to run closed beta testing for their games prior to a public release.

Developers can request Steam keys of their products to use as they see fit, such as to give away in promotions, to provide to selected users for review, or to give to key resellers for different prioritization. Valve generally honors all such requests, but clarified that it would evaluate some requests to avoid giving keys to games or other offerings that are designed to manipulate the Steam storefront and other features.

Valve enabled the ability for multiple developers to create bundles of games from their offerings in June 2021.

=== Steam Workshop ===
The Steam Workshop is a service that allows users to share user-made content and mods for video games available on Steam. New levels, art assets, gameplay modifications, or other content may be published to or installed from the Workshop depending on the title. The Workshop was originally used for distribution of new in-game items for Team Fortress 2; it was redesigned to extend support for any game in early 2012, including modifications for The Elder Scrolls V: Skyrim. A May 2012 patch for Portal 2, enabled by a new map-making tool through the Workshop, introduced the ability to share user-created levels. Independently developed games, including Dungeons of Dredmor, are able to provide Workshop support for user-made content. Dota 2 became Valve's third published title available for the Workshop in June 2012; its features include customizable accessories, character skins, and announcer packs. Workshop content may be monetized; Newell said that the Workshop was inspired by gold farming from World of Warcraft to find a way to incentive both players and content creators in video games, and which had informed it of its approach to Team Fortress 2 and its later multiplayer games.

By January 2015, Valve themselves had provided some user-developed Workshop content as paid-for features in Valve-developed games, including Team Fortress 2 and Dota 2; with over $57 million being paid to content creators using the Workshop. Valve began allowing developers to use these advanced features in January 2015; both the developer and content generator share the profits of the sale of these items; the feature went live in April 2015, starting with various mods for Skyrim. This feature was pulled a few days afterward following negative user feedback and reports of pricing and copyright misuse. Six months later, Valve stated it was still interested in offering this type of functionality in the future. In November 2015, the Steam client was updated with the ability for game developers to offer in-game items for direct sale via the store interface, with Rust being the first game to use the feature.

=== SteamVR ===
SteamVR is a virtual reality hardware and software platform developed by Valve, with a focus on allowing "room-scale" experiences using positional tracking base stations, as opposed to those requiring the player to stay in a singular location. SteamVR was first introduced for the Oculus Rift headset in 2014, and later expanded to support other virtual reality headsets. Initially released for support on Windows, macOS, and Linux, Valve dropped macOS support for SteamVR in May 2020. SteamVR 2.0 was released in October 2023, introducing a new overlay interface that is unified with the updated SteamOS and Big Picture mode interfaces.

== Storefront curation ==
Until 2012, Valve handpicked games to be included on the Steam service, limiting these to games supported by a major developer or produced by smaller studios with proven track records. Since then, Valve have sought ways to enable more games to be offered through Steam, while pulling away from manually approving games, short of validating that a game runs on the platforms the publisher had indicated. In 2017, Steam development team member Alden Kroll said that Valve knows that Steam is in a position of near-monopoly for game sales on personal computers, and in order not to control what is sold they have tried to take the process of adding games outside Steam's control. At the same time, Valve recognized that unfettered control of games in the service can lead to discovery problems as well as low-quality games.

=== Steam Greenlight ===
Valve announced Steam Greenlight to streamline game addition to the service in July 2012 and released the following month. Through Greenlight, Steam users would choose which games were added to the service. Developers were able to submit information about their games, as well as early builds or beta versions, for consideration by users. Users would pledge support for these games, and Valve would make top-pledged games available on Steam. In response to complaints during its first week that finding games to support was made difficult by a flood of inappropriate or false submissions, Valve required developers to pay US$100 to list a game on the service. Those fees were donated to the charity Child's Play. This fee was met with some concern from smaller developers, who often are already working in a deficit and may not have the money to cover such fees. A later modification allowed developers to put conceptual ideas on the Greenlight service to garner interest in potential projects free-of-charge; votes from such projects are visible only to the developer. Valve also allowed non-gaming software to be voted onto the service through Greenlight.

The initial process offered by Greenlight was panned by developers because while they favored the concept, the rate of games that were eventually approved were small. In January 2013, Newell stated that Valve recognized that its role in Greenlight was perceived as a bottleneck, something the company was planning to eliminate in the future through an open marketplace infrastructure. On the eve of Greenlight's first anniversary, Valve simultaneously approved 100 games to demonstrate this change of direction.

=== Steam Direct ===
Valve launched Steam Direct on June 13, 2017, following Greenlight's shutdown the week before. With Steam Direct, a developer or publisher wishing to distribute their game on Steam needs only to complete appropriate identification and tax forms for Valve and then pay a recoupable application fee for each game they intend to publish. Once they apply, a developer must wait thirty days before publishing the game to allow Valve to review the game to ensure it is "configured correctly, matches the description provided on the store page, and doesn't contain malicious content".

On announcing its plans for Steam Direct, Valve suggested the fee would be in the range of $100–5,000, meant to encourage earnest software submissions to the service and weed out poor quality games that are treated as shovelware, improving the discovery pipeline to Steam's customers. Smaller developers raised concerns about the Direct fee harming them, and excluding potentially good indie games from reaching the Steam store. Valve opted to set the Direct fee at $100 after reviewing concerns from the community and outlined plans to improve their discovery algorithms and inject more human involvement to help these. Valve refunds the fee should the game exceed $1,000 in sales. In the process of transitioning from Greenlight to Direct, Valve mass-approved most of the 3,400 remaining games that were still in Greenlight, though the company noted that not all of these were in fit state to be published. Valve anticipated that the volume of new games added to the service would further increase with Direct in place. Some groups, such as publisher Raw Fury and crowdfunding/investment site Fig, have offered to pay the Direct fee for indie developers who cannot afford it. VentureBeat compared the system to the Google Play Store.

=== Games discovery changes ===
Without more direct interaction in the curation process, Valve had looked to find methods to allow players to find games they would be more likely to buy based on previous purchase patterns. Valve has rejected the use of paid advertising or placement on the storefront, which would have created a "pay to win" scenario. Instead, the company had relied on algorithms and other automatic features for game discovery, which has allowed for unexpected hits to gain more visibility.

The September 2014 "Discovery Update" added tools that would allow existing Steam users to be curators for game recommendations, and sorting functions that presented more popular games and recommended games specific to the user. This Discovery update was considered successful by Valve, as in March 2015 it reported increased use of the Steam Storefront and an 18% increase of sales by revenue from just prior to the update. A second Discovery update was released November 2016, giving users more control over what games they want to see or ignore within the Steam Store, alongside tools for developers and publishers to better customize and present their game.

By February 2017, Valve reported that with the second Discovery update, the number of games shown to users via the store's front page increased by 42%, with more conversions into sales from that viewership. In 2016, more games are meeting a rough metric of success defined by Valve as selling more than $200,000 in revenues in its first 90 days of release. Valve added a "Curator Connect" program in December 2017. Curators can set up descriptors for the type of games they are interested in, preferred languages, and other tags along with social media profiles, while developers can find and reach out to specific curators from this information, and, after review, provide them directly with access to their game. This step, which eliminates the use of a Steam redemption key, is aimed at reducing the reselling of keys, as well as dissuading users who may be trying to game the curator system to obtain free game keys.

Valve has attempted to deal with "fake games", those that are built around reused assets and little other innovation, by adding Steam Explorers atop its existing Steam Curator program. Any Steam user can sign up to be an Explorer and be asked to look at under-performing games on the service to either vouch that the game is truly original or if it is an example of a "fake game", at which point Valve can take action to remove the game.

In July 2019, the Steam Labs feature was introduced as a means to showcase experimental discovery features Valve considered for including into Steam, to seek public feedback. For example, an initial experiment released at launch was the Interactive Recommender, which uses artificial intelligence algorithms pulling data from the user's past gameplay history to suggest new games that may be of interest to them. As these experiments mature through end-user testing, they have then been brought into the storefront as direct features.

The September 2019 Discovery update, which Valve claimed would improve the visibility of niche and lesser-known games, was met with criticism from some indie game developers, who recorded a significant drop in the exposure of their games, including new wishlist additions and appearances in the "More Like This" and "Discovery queue" sections of the store.

Steam Charts were introduced in September 2022 and publicly track the storefront's best-selling and most-played games, including historically by week and month. Charts replaced a previous statistics page to be more comprehensive, and features content that had previously been part of third-party websites including SteamSpy, SteamDB, and SteamCharts. Cataloging of accessibility features were added to Steam in mid-2025. Wishlist categories were added in July 2026.

Valve added a personal calendar for game releases relevant to the user's past game history in October 2026, showing releases in the upcoming week and near-term, with the user able to customize which results to show or hide based on genre and other factors.

== Games and account policies ==
In June 2015, Valve created a formal process to allow purchasers to request refunds, with refunds guaranteed within the first two weeks as long as the player had not spent more than two hours in a game. Prior to June 2015, Valve had a no-refunds policy, but allowed them in certain circumstances, such as digital rights management issues or false advertising.

Games that are no longer available for sale for various reasons can still be downloaded and played by those who have already purchased these.

=== Quality control and disallowed functionality ===
With the launch of Steam Direct, effectively removing any curation of games by Valve prior to being published on Steam, there have been several incidents of published games that have attempted to mislead Steam users. Starting in June 2018, Valve has taken actions against games and developers that are "trolling" the system; in September 2018, Valve explicitly defined that trolls on Steam "aren't actually interested in good faith efforts to make and sell games to you or anyone". As an example, Valve's Doug Lombardi stated that the game Active Shooter, which would have allowed the player to play as either a SWAT team member tasked to take down the shooter in a school shooting incident or as the shooter themselves, was an example of trolling, as he claimed it was "designed to do nothing but generate outrage and cause conflict through its existence". Within a month of clarifying its definition of trolling, Valve removed approximately 170 games from Steam.

In addition to removing bad actors, Valve has also taken steps to reduce the impact of "fake games" which could be used to manipulate the trading card marketplace or artificially boost a user's Steam level, in addition to changes in Steam to prevent such abuse. Some of these changes have resulted in select false positives for legitimate games with unusual end-user usage patterns, such as Wandersong, which was flagged in January 2019 for what the developer believed was related to near-unanimous positive user reviews for the game.

Other actions taken by developers against the terms of service or other policies have prompted Valve to remove games, which has included asset flips, review manipulation, misuse of Steamworks tools, and hostile activities towards Steam users.

Valve has banned games that incorporate blockchain-type technologies, such as non-fungible tokens (NFTs) since 2022 due to the questionable nature of their markets.

With the rise of generative AI in 2023, Valve originally established that games with content generated in this manner could be distributed through Steam, though cautioned developers about assuring that they had the rights for this type of content. As greater concerns about the copyright and ethical nature of generational AI in the latter half of 2023, Valve clarified its stance in January 2024, requiring games that did use content from generational AI to disclose this on the game's store page, including methods that the developers used to assure the AI engines did not generate illegal content. By mid 2026, large language model AI systems had become sufficiently robust that a game could be cloned from gameplay videos, leading to several cases of numerous copycat games being released on Steam even before the original game, and affect indie developers. A Valve representative said they did not want to limit the types of tools one may use to make a game, and had suggested that developers should try to make their games more compelling than a single gameplay mechanic as to distinguish their work from AI-driven clones.

Valve updated policies in February 2025 to ban games that incorporated paid advertising as part of the gameplay cycle, such as viewing an ad for virtual rewards.

=== Mature content and moderation ===
Valve has also removed or threatened to remove games due to inappropriate or mature content, though there was often confusion as to what material qualified for this. For example, Eek Games' House Party included scenes of nudity and sexual encounters in its original release, which drew criticism from conservative religious organization National Center on Sexual Exploitation, leading Valve to remove the title. Eek Games later included censor bars within the game, allowing the game to be added back to Steam, though it offered a patch on its website to remove the bars. In May 2018, several developers of anime-stylized games that contained some light nudity, such as HuniePop, were told by Valve they had to address sexual content within their games or face removal from Steam, leading to questions of inconsistent application of Valve's policies. The National Center on Sexual Exploitation took credit for convincing Valve to target these games. However, Valve later rescinded its orders, allowing these games to remain.

In June 2018, Valve clarified its policy on content, taking a more hands-off approach outside of illegal material. Rather than trying to make decisions themselves on what content is appropriate, Valve enhanced its filtering system to allow developers and publishers to indicate and justify the types of mature content (violence, nudity, and sexual content) in their games. Users can block games that are marked with this type of content from appearing in the store, and if they have not blocked it, they are presented with the description before they can continue to the store page. Developers and publishers with existing games on Steam have been strongly encouraged to complete these forms for these games, while Valve will use moderators to make sure new games are appropriately marked. Valve also committed to developing anti-harassment tools to support developers who may find their game amid controversy.

"So we ended up going back to one of the principles in the forefront of our minds when we started Steam, and more recently as we worked on Steam Direct to open up the Store to many more developers: Valve shouldn't be the ones deciding this. If you're a player, we shouldn't be choosing for you what content you can or can't buy. If you're a developer, we shouldn't be choosing what content you're allowed to create. Those choices should be yours to make. Our role should be to provide systems and tools to support your efforts to make these choices for yourself, and to help you do it in a way that makes you feel comfortable."

— Erik Johnson of Valve

Until these tools were in place, some adult-themed games were delayed for release. Negligee: Love Stories, developed by Dharker Studios, was one of the first sexually explicit games to be offered after the introduction of the tools in September 2018. Dharker noted in discussions with Valve that they would be liable for any content-related fines or penalties that countries may place on Valve, a clause of their publishing contract with Steam, and took steps to restrict sale of the game in over 20 regions. Games that feature mature themes with primary characters that visually appear to be underaged, even if the game's narrative establishes them as adults, have been banned by Valve.

In March 2019, Valve faced pressure over Rape Day, a planned game described as being a dark comedy and power fantasy where the player would control a serial rapist amid a zombie apocalypse. Valve ultimately decided against offering the game on Steam, arguing that while it "[respects] developers' desire to express themselves", there were "costs and risks" associated with the game, and the developers had "chosen content matter and a way of representing it that makes it very difficult for us to help them [find an audience]".

In December 2020, following a complaint from Medienanstalt Hamburg/Schleswig-Holstein regarding store page images on Steam, Valve opted to block access to games with "Adults Only 18+" pornographic content in Germany. The Anti-Defamation League published a report in November 2024 accusing Valve of allowing the proliferation of hate and anti-semitic content generated by users and user groups, with over 40,000 groups identified to have names referring to such extreme views. Senator Mark Warner followed with a letter to Valve, asking the company if it was following its published online content policies and to review the cases identified by the ADL.

Valve updated its storefront policies in July 2025 to disallow games that "content that may violate the rules and standards set forth by Steam's payment processors and related card networks and banks, or internet network providers", leading to around 400 games rated for mature audiences being pulled from the service. Valve affirmed this change was made due to pressure from banks and payment processors. This action appeared to arise from an open letter sent to the payment processors by Collective Shout, an Australian non-profit group. Melinda Tankard Reist, the leader of Collective Shout, said that it had identified over 500 games with such themes, such as rape, incest and child abuse, leading to the call for payment processors to take action. In related actions by September 2025, Valve changed its rules for adult games, disallowing them to use the early access program as part of their game's release, and requiring existing games that intend to add mature content to issue it as DLC that can be reviewed by Valve, rather than as a patch.

In August 2025, in compliance with the United Kingdom's Online Safety Act, Steam began requiring age verification before allowing UK users to view store pages for games with adult content. As of September 2025, the only available method of verification is via users adding a valid credit card to their account, which has drawn some criticism surrounding adult users who cannot obtain a credit card.

== Platforms, devices and regions ==
Valve introduced the Steam Hardware Survey in 2003 ahead of the release of Half-Life 2. At that time, no information was available as to the distribution of CPU and GPU units among gamers, so Valve used the survey, which automatically collected hardware information with the user's permission through the Steam client, to collect this information and refine the hardware targets for Half-Life 2 to meet the widest possible specifications. Since then, Valve continues to use the Steam Hardware Survey to collect hardware distribution information, sharing the net results with other developers to understand the current market, as well as to make choices on when to discontinue support for older hardware and software.

=== Windows ===
Steam was originally released exclusively for Microsoft Windows in 2003, but has since been ported to other platforms. More recent Steam client versions use the Chromium Embedded Framework. To take advantage of some of its features for newer interface elements, Steam uses 64-bit versions of Chromium, which makes it unsupported on older operating systems such as Windows XP and Windows Vista. Steam on Windows also relies on some security features built into later versions of Windows. Support for XP and Vista was dropped in 2019. While users still on those operating systems can use the client, they do not have access to newer features. Around 0.2% of Steam users were affected by this when it began. In March 2023, Valve announced that Steam would drop support for Windows 7 and 8 on January 1, 2024.

=== macOS ===
Valve announced a client for macOS in March 2010. The announcement was preceded by a change in the Steam beta client to support the cross-platform WebKit web browser rendering engine instead of the Trident engine of Internet Explorer. Valve teased the release by emailing several images to Mac community and gaming websites; the images featured characters from Valve games with Apple logos and parodies of vintage Macintosh advertisements. Valve developed a full video homage to Apple's 1984 Macintosh commercial to announce the availability of Half-Life 2 on the service; some concept images for the video had previously been used to tease the Mac Steam client.

Steam for macOS was originally planned for release in April 2010 before being pushed back to May 12, 2010. In addition to the Steam client, several features were made available to developers, allowing them to take advantage of the cross-platform Source engine and Steamworks' platform and network capabilities. Through the Steam Play functionality, the macOS client allows players who have purchased compatible products in the Windows version to download the Mac versions at no cost. The Steam Cloud, along with many multiplayer PC games, also supports cross-platform play.

With Apple discontinuing support for Intel-based Macs after the release of macOS Tahoe in late 2025 in favor of Apple silicon, Valve updated the beta version of the Steam client to include native support for Apple silicon without the need for emulation via Rosetta 2.

=== Linux ===
In July 2012, Valve announced that it was developing a client for Linux based on the Ubuntu distribution. This announcement followed months of speculation, primarily from the website Phoronix that had discovered evidence of Linux developing in recent builds of Steam and other Valve games. Newell stated that getting Steam and games to work on Linux is a key strategy for Valve; Newell called the closed nature of Microsoft Windows 8 "a catastrophe for everyone in the PC space", and that Linux would maintain "the openness of the platform". Valve is extending support to any developers that want to bring their games to Linux, by "making it as easy as possible for anybody who's engaged with us—putting their games on Steam and getting those running on Linux", according to Newell.

The team developing the Linux client had been working for a year before the announcement to validate that such a port would be possible. As of the official announcement, a near-feature-complete Steam client for Linux had been developed and successfully run on Ubuntu. Internal beta testing of the Linux client started in October 2012; external beta testing occurred in early November the same year. Open beta clients for Linux were made available in late December 2012, and the client was officially released in mid-February 2013. At the time of announcement, Valve's Linux division assured consumers that its first game on the OS, Left 4 Dead 2, would run at an acceptable frame rate and with a degree of connectivity with the Windows and Mac OS X versions. From there, it began working on porting other games to Ubuntu and expanding to other Linux distributions. Versions of Steam working under Fedora and Red Hat Enterprise Linux were released by October 2013. There were over 500 Linux-compatible games on Steam in June 2014, and in February 2019, Steam for Linux had 5,800 native games and was described as having "the power to keep Linux [gaming] alive" by Engadget.

In August 2018, Valve released a beta version of Proton (named Steam Play), an open-source Windows compatibility layer for Linux, so that Linux users could run Windows games on Linux directly through Steam. Proton comprises a set of open-source tools including Wine and DXVK. The software allows the use of Steam-supported controllers, even those not compatible with Windows. Released in February 2022, Valve's handheld computer, the Steam Deck, runs SteamOS 3.0, which is based on Arch Linux, and uses Proton to support Windows-based games without native Linux ports. Prior to the Steam Deck's release, Valve worked with various middleware developers to make sure their tools were compatible with Proton on Linux and maximize the number of games that the Steam Deck would support. This included working with various anti-cheat developers such as Easy Anti-Cheat and BattlEye to make sure their solutions worked with Proton. To help with compatibility, Valve developed a classification system to rank games based on how well they performed on Steam Deck out of the box.

Support for Nvidia's proprietary deep learning super sampling (DLSS) on supported video cards and games was added to Proton in June 2021, though this is not available on the Steam Deck which is based on AMD hardware.

In March 2022, Google offered a prerelease version of Steam on Chromebooks, and entered public beta in November 2022. In August 2025, Google announced that it will end Steam for Chromebook support in 2026.

=== Steamworks on PlayStation 3 ===
At E3 2010, Newell announced that Steamworks would arrive on the PlayStation 3 with Portal 2. Steamworks made its debut on consoles with Portal 2's PlayStation 3 release. Several features—including cross-platform play and instant messaging, Steam Cloud for saved games, and the ability for PS3 owners to download Portal 2 from Steam (Windows and Mac)—were offered. Valve's Counter-Strike: Global Offensive also supports Steamworks and cross-platform features on the PlayStation 3, including using keyboard and mouse controls as an alternative to the gamepad. Valve said it "hope[s] to expand upon this foundation with more Steam features and functionality in DLC and future content releases".

Newell said that it would have liked to bring the service to the Xbox 360 through the game Counter-Strike: Global Offensive, but later said that cross-platform play would not be present in the final version of the game. Valve attributes the inability to use Steamworks on the Xbox 360 to limitations in the Xbox Live regulations of the ability to deliver patches and new content. Valve's Erik Johnson stated that Microsoft required new content on the console to be certified and validated before distribution, which would limit the usefulness of Steamworks' delivery approach.

=== Mobile apps ===
Valve released an official Steam client for iOS and Android devices in late January 2012, following a short beta period. The application allows players to log into their accounts to browse the storefront, manage their games, and communicate with friends in the Steam community. The application also incorporates a two-factor authentication system that works with Steam Guard. Newell stated that the application was a strong request from Steam users and sees it as a means "to make [Steam] richer and more accessible for everyone". A mobile Steam client for Windows Phone devices was released in June 2016. In May 2019, a mobile chat-only client for Steam was released under the name Steam Chat.

On May 14, 2018, a "Steam Link" app with remote play features was released in beta to allow users to stream games to Android phones, named after discontinued set-top box Steam Link. It was also submitted to the iOS App Store, but was denied by Apple Inc., who cited "business conflicts with app guidelines". Apple later clarified its rule at the following Apple Worldwide Developers Conference in early June, in that iOS apps may not offer an app-like purchasing store, but does not restrict apps that provide remote desktop support. In response, Valve removed the ability to purchase games or other content through the app and resubmitted it for approval in June 2018, where it was accepted by Apple and allowed on its store in May 2019. A "Steam Video" for video streaming was also announced but not released.

=== SteamOS ===
Valve released SteamOS in 2013, a customized Linux-based operating system designed to support the use of Steam and playing Linux-native games. It was released alongside Valve's original Steam Machine concept, a minimum specification for other hardware manufacturers to prepare computers to use SteamOS directly. Additional hardware were also released to support Steam Machines including the first generation of the Steam Controller and the Steam Link, a set-top box that allowed streaming from a computer to a television display.

Thought the initial concept for Steam Machines did not gain much traction, with the concept shelved around 2018, Valve continued to develop SteamOS, making it available for users making their own computers. Valve also developed Proton, a software emulation layer that allowed most Windows games to run on Linux without any modification.

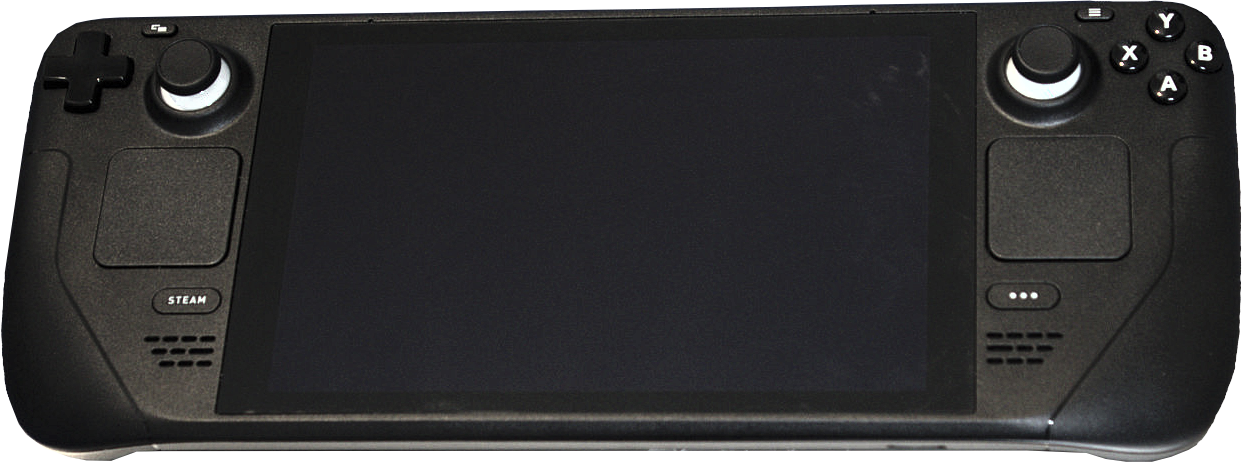
Steam Deck

With lessons learned from Steam Machines, Valve released the Steam Deck, a handheld gaming computer running an updated version of SteamOS with Proton, in February 2022. Updates to Steam and SteamOS at this time included better Proton layer support for Windows-based games, improved user interface features in the Steam client for the Steam Deck display, and adding Dynamic Cloud Saves to Steam to allow synchronizing saved games while a game is being played. Valve began marking all games on the service through a Steam Deck Validated program to indicate how compatible they were with the Steam Deck software, and including this information on the Steam storefront pages. The validation program considered aspects such as the performance of the game's graphics, legibility of in-game text and icons on the Steam Deck screen, user input limitations, and similar factors, with games rated as either Verified, Playable, and Unsupported, the latter typically applying to games that require a Windows-only form of digital-rights management.

The Steam Deck was successful, and led Valve to develop its own standalone Steam Machine gaming computer, released in June 2026, and the Steam Frame virtual reality headset, alongside a second-generation Steam Controller. Valve extended the Steam Deck Verification program to cover both the new Steam Machine and Steam Frame with the release of the Steam Machine.

=== Steam Cloud Play ===
Valve included beta support for Steam Cloud Play in May 2020 for developers to allow users to play games in their library which developers and publishers have opted to allow in a cloud gaming service. At launch, Steam Cloud Play only worked through Nvidia's GeForce Now service and would link up to other cloud services in the future though whether Valve would run its own cloud gaming service was unclear.

=== Steam China ===
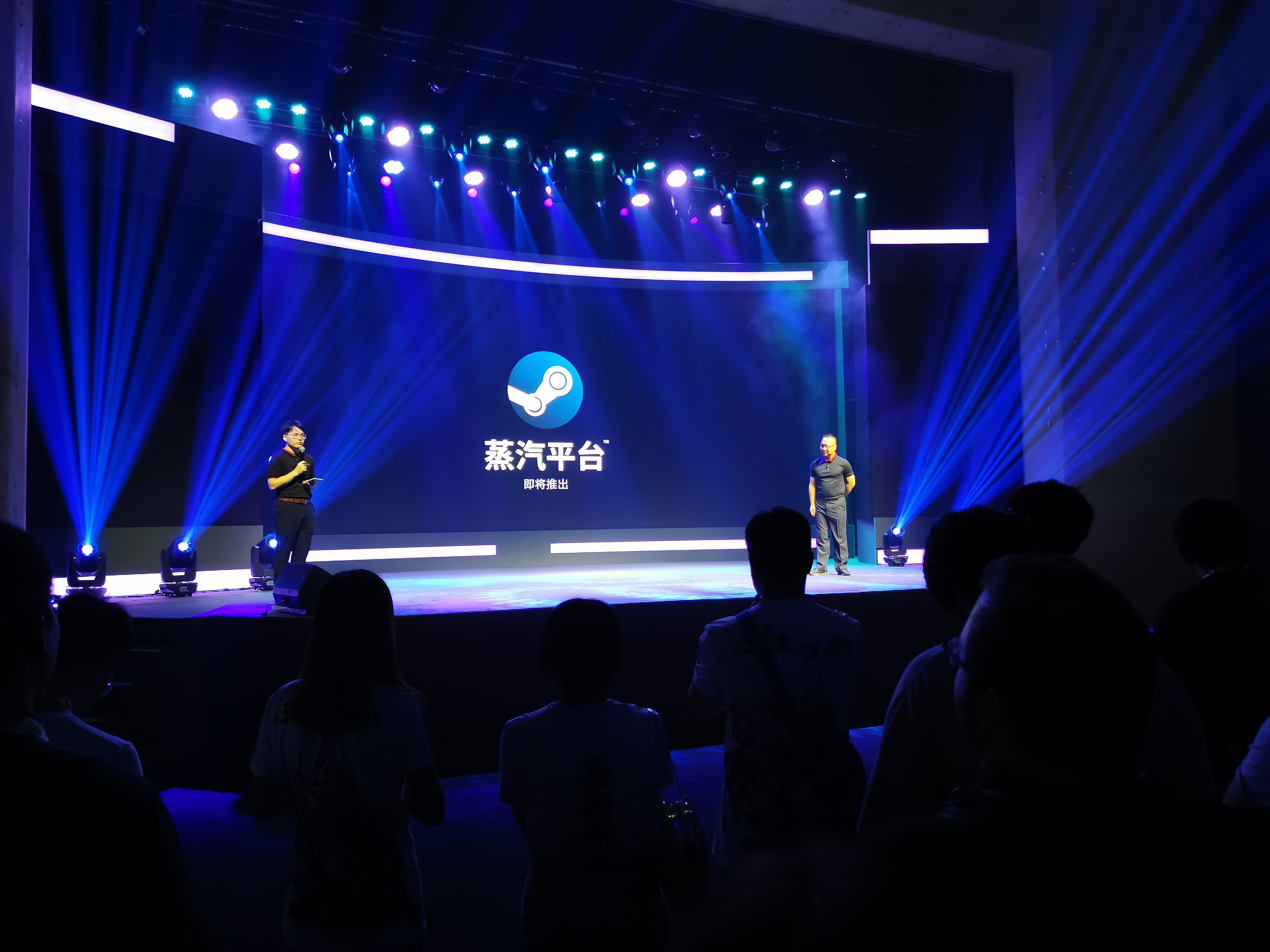
The Steam China launch event in August 2019 in Shanghai

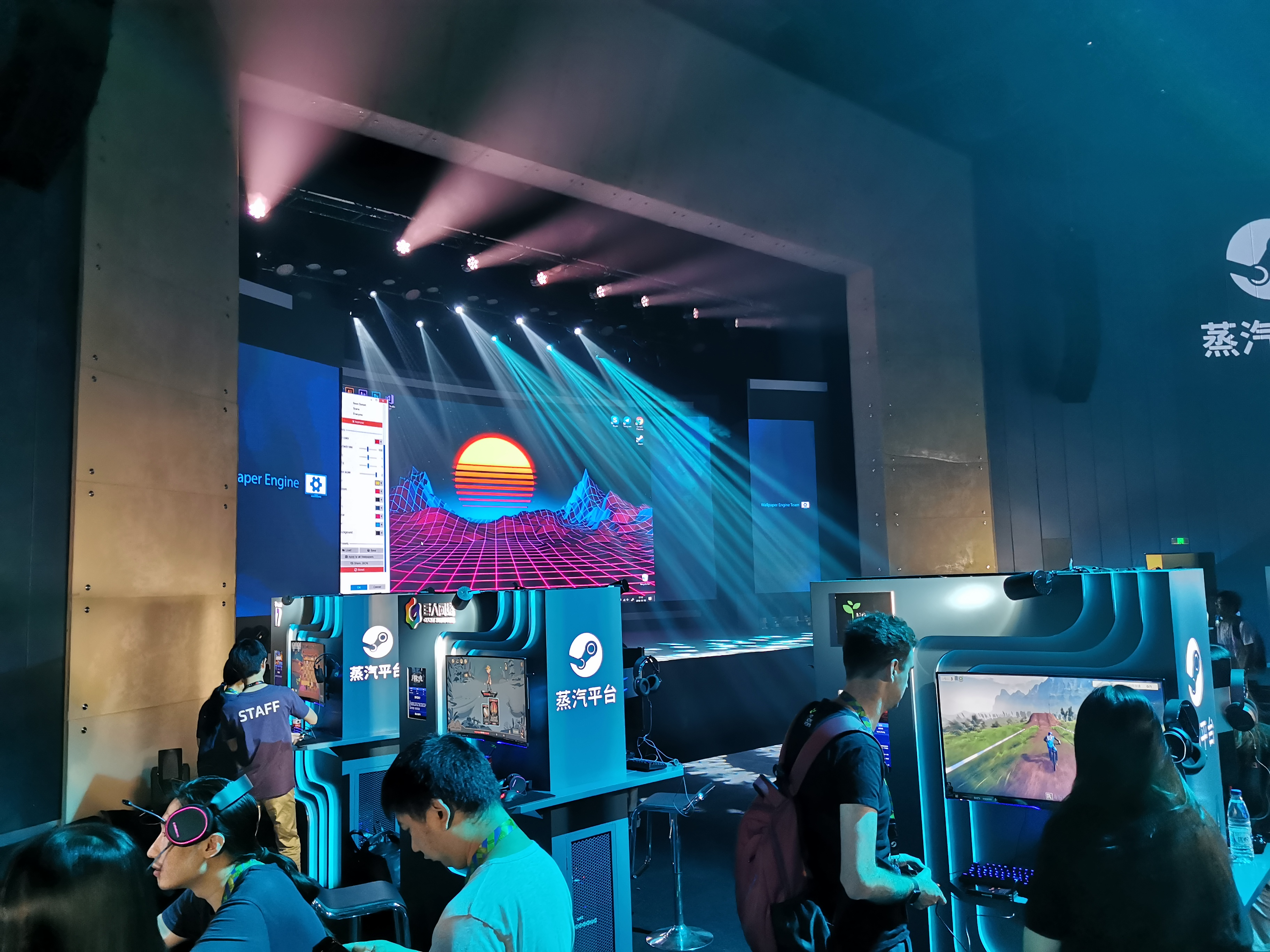
Steam China Release Event (featuring Wallpaper Engine)

China has strict regulations on video games and Internet use; however, access to Steam is allowed through China's governmental firewalls. By November 2017, more than half of the Steam userbase was fluent in Chinese, an effect created by the large popularity of Dota 2 and PlayerUnknown's Battlegrounds in the country, and several developers have reported that Chinese players make up close to 30% of the total players for their games.

Following a Chinese government-ordered temporary block of many of Steam's functions in December 2017, Valve and Perfect World announced they would help to provide an officially sanctioned version of Steam that meets Chinese Internet requirements. Perfect World has worked with Valve before to help bring Dota 2 and Counter-Strike: Global Offensive to the country through approved government processes. All games to be released on Steam China are expected to pass through the government approval process and meet other governmental requirements, such as requiring a Chinese company to run any game with an online presence.

The platform is known locally as "Steam Platform" (Chinese: 蒸汽平台; pinyin: Zhēngqì píngtái) and runs independently from the rest of Steam. It was made to comply with China's strict regulations on video games. Valve does not plan to prevent Chinese users from accessing the global Steam platform and will try to assure that a player's cloud data remains usable between the two. The client launched as an open beta on February 9, 2021, with about 40 games available at launch. As of December 2021, only around 100 games that have been reviewed and licensed by the government are available through Steam China.

On December 25, 2021, reports emerged that Steam's global service was the target of a domain name system attack that prevented users in China from accessing its site. The Chinese government Ministry of Industry and Information Technology (MIIT) later confirmed that Chinese gamers would no longer be able to use Steam's global service as its international domain name has been designated as "illegal". The block has effectively locked all Chinese users out of games they had purchased through Steam's international service. In 2023, reports emerged that the Steam Store could be used as normal in China, while the Steam Community was still blocked.

== Reception and impact ==
Steam's success has led to some criticism for supporting DRM and for being an effective monopoly. In 2012, Free Software Foundation founder Richard Stallman called DRM using Steam on Linux "unethical", but still better than Windows.

Steam's customer service has been highly criticized, with users citing poor response times or lack of response. In March 2015, Valve was given a failing "F" grade from the Better Business Bureau due to a large number of complaints about Valve's handling of Steam, leading Valve's Erik Johnson to state that "we don't feel like our customer service support is where it needs to be right now". Johnson stated the company plans to better integrate customer support features into the Steam client and be more responsive. In May 2017, in addition to hiring more staff for customer service, Valve publicized pages that show the number and type of customer service requests it was handling over the last 90 days, with an average of 75,000 entered each day. Of those, requests for refunds were the largest segment, and which Valve could resolve within hours, followed by account security and recovery requests. Valve stated at this time that 98% of all service requests were processed within 24 hours of filing.

=== Users and revenue ===
In August 2011, Valve said Steam's revenue, estimated to be $1 billion in 2010, was comparable to that of its published games. Gabe Newell said the company was "tremendously profitable", being more profitable per employee than companies like Google or Apple. Valve reported that there were 125 million active accounts on Steam by the end of 2015. (Note: In 2013, Valve defined an active account as owning a product or logging in during the past 90 days.) By August 2017, the company reported that there were 27 million new active accounts since January 2016, bringing the total number of active users to at least 150 million. Most accounts were from North America and Western Europe, with there being a significant growth in accounts from Asia around 2017, spurred by its work to help localize the client and make additional currency options available to purchasers. In September 2014, 1.4 million accounts belonged to Australian users; this grew to 2.2 million by October 2015.

Valve also considers concurrent users — how many accounts are logged in at the same time — a key indicator of the success of the platform. In August 2017, Valve reported a peak of 14 million concurrent players, up from 8.4 million in 2015, with 33 million active daily and 67 million active monthly. By January 2018, the peak online count had reached 18.5 million, with over 47 million daily active users. During the COVID-19 pandemic in 2020, in which a large proportion of the world's population were at home, Steam saw a concurrent player count of over 23 million in March, along with several games seeing similar record-breaking concurrent counts. The highest concurrent player count reached 39.2 million by December 2024, in part from the combined releases of Marvel Rivals and Path of Exile 2, and 40 million by February 2025 with the release of Monster Hunter Wilds.

In October 2025, Steam reached a new all-time concurrent user peak of 41.6 million, surpassing its previous record by over a million — a surge attributed largely to the release of Battlefield 6. An analysis by Alinea Analytics estimated that in the first 11 months of 2025, Steam had brought in $16.3 billion in revenue.

=== Sales and distribution ===
Sales graph for Garry's Mod, released by the game's developer. The largest spikes are caused by sales and promotions. By April 2014, it had sold nearly five million copies through the service.

The number of new games, by year, published on Steam, estimated by Steam Spy in January 2020.

Steam has grown from seven games in 2004 to over 30,000 by 2019, with additional non-gaming products, such as creation software, DLC, and videos, numbering over 20,000. More than 50,000 games were on the service as of February 2021. The growth of games on Steam is attributed to changes in Valve's curation approach, which allows publishers to add games without Valve's direct involvement, and games supporting virtual reality technology. The addition of Greenlight and Direct has accelerated the number of games present on the service, with almost 40% of the 19,000 games on Steam by the end of 2017 having been released in 2017. Before Greenlight, Valve saw about five new games published each week. Greenlight expanded this to about seventy, and which doubled to one hundred and eighty per week following the introduction of Direct.

Although Steam provides direct sales data to developers and publishers, it does not provide public sales data. In 2011, Valve's Jason Holtman stated that the company felt that such data was outdated for a digital market. Data that Valve does provide cannot be released without permission because of a non-disclosure agreement.

Developers and publishers have asked for some metrics of sales for games, to allow them to judge the potential success of a title by reviewing how similar games have performed. Algorithms that worked on publicly available data through user profiles to estimate sales data with some accuracy led to the creation of the website Steam Spy in 2015. Steam Spy was credited with being reasonably accurate, but in April 2018, Valve added new privacy settings that defaulted to hiding user game profiles, stating this was part of compliance with the General Data Protection Regulation (GDPR) of the European Union. The change broke the method by which Steam Spy had collected data, rendering it unusable. A few months later, another method had been developed using game achievements to estimate sales with similar accuracy, but Valve shortly changed the Steam API that reduced its functionality. Some have asserted that Valve used the GDPR change as a means to block methods of estimating sales, although Valve subsequently promised to provide tools to developers to help gain such insights that it says will be more accurate. In 2020, Simon Carless revised an approach originally proposed by Mike Boxleiter as early as 2013, with Carless's method of estimating sales based on the number of reviews it has on Steam with a modified "Boxleiter number" used as a multiplication factor.

=== Competition and curation impact ===
The accessibility of publishing games on digital storefronts like Steam has been described as key to the popularity of indie games. As these processes allow developers to publish games on Steam with minimal oversight from Valve, journalists have criticized Valve for lacking curation policies that make it difficult to find quality games among poorly produced games, sometimes called "shovelware".

Following the launch of Steam Direct, the video game industry was split on Valve's hands-off approach. Some praised Valve for favoring avoiding trying to be a moral adjudicator of content and letting consumers decide what content they want to see, while others felt that this would encourage developers to publish games that are purposely hateful, and that Valve's reliance on user-filters and algorithms may not succeed in blocking undesirable content. Some further criticized the decision based on the financial gain from avoiding blocking any game content, as Valve collects a cut from sales through Steam. In 2018 the National Center on Sexual Exploitation denounced the policy for avoiding corporate and social responsibility "in light of the rise of sexual violence and exploitation games being hosted on Steam".

Steam was estimated to have the largest share of the PC digital distribution market in the 2010s. In 2013, sales via the Steam catalog are estimated to be between 50 and 75 percent of the total PC gaming market. In 2010 and 2013, with an increase in retail copies of major game publishers integrating or requiring Steam, retailers and journalists referred to the service as a monopoly, which they claimed can be detrimental to the industry and that sector competition would yield positive results for consumers. Several developers also noted that Steam's influence on the PC gaming market is powerful and one that smaller developers cannot afford to ignore or not work with, but believe that Valve's corporate practices make it a type of "benevolent dictator".

Because of Valve's oversight of sales data, estimates of the market share that Steam has of the videogame market are difficult to compile. Stardock, developer of competing platform Impulse, estimated that Steam had a 70% share in 2009. In February 2011, Forbes reported that Steam sales constituted 50–70% of the US$4 billion market for downloaded PC games and that Steam offered game producers gross margins of 70% of the purchase price, compared with 30% at retail.

Steam has been criticized for its reported 30% cut on revenue with publishers from game sales, a value that is similar to other digital storefronts according to IGN. However, some critics have asserted that the share no longer scales with cheaper costs of serving data. A 2019 Game Developers Conference survey showed only 6% of the 400 respondents deemed the share justified. Epic Games' Tim Sweeney postulated that Valve could reduce its cut to 8%, given that content delivery network costs has dropped significantly. Other services have promoted their sites having a lower cut, including the Epic Games Store and Discord.

In November 2009, online retailers Impulse, Direct2Drive and GamersGate refused to offer Call of Duty: Modern Warfare 2 because it includes mandatory installation of Steamworks. Direct2Drive accused Steamworks of being a "trojan horse". Valve's business development director Jason Holtman replied Steamworks' features were chosen by developers and based on consumer wants and that Modern Warfare 2 was one of Steam's "greatest sellers". In December 2010, MCV/Develop reported that "key traditional retailers" would stop offering games that integrate Steam.

A 2025 report by Gamalytic found that of the approximately 13,000 games released on Steam from January to October 2025, only 8% were estimated to have made revenues over $100,000, while 40% had failed to make more than $100, a cost of applying to publish a game on Steam.

=== Legal disputes ===
Steam's predominance has led to Valve becoming involved in various legal cases. The lack of a formal refund policy led the Australian Competition and Consumer Commission (ACCC) to sue Valve in September 2014 for violating Australian consumer laws that required stores to offer refunds for faulty or broken products. The ACCC won the lawsuit in March 2016, though recognizing Valve changed its policy in the interim. In December 2016, the court fined Valve A$3 million, as well as requiring Valve to include proper language for Australian consumers outlining their rights when purchasing games off of Steam. In January 2018, Valve filed for special leave to appeal the decision to the High Court of Australia, but the High Court dismissed this request. In September 2018, Valve's Steam refund policy was found to violate France's consumer laws, and it was fined €147,000 and required to modify its refund policy.

In December 2015, the French consumer group UFC-Que Choisir initiated a lawsuit against Valve for several of its Steam policies that conflicted with French law, including the restriction on reselling of purchased games, which is legal within the European Union. In September 2019, the Tribunal de grande instance de Paris found that Valve's practice of preventing resales violated the EU's Information Society Directive of 2001 and the Computer Programs Directive of 2009, and required them to allow it in the future. The Interactive Software Federation of Europe (ISFE) issued a statement that the French court ruling goes against established EU case law related to digital copies and threatened to upend much of the digital distribution systems in Europe should it be upheld.

In August 2016, BT Group filed a lawsuit against Valve, stating that Steam's client infringed on four of its patents, which it said were used within Steam's Library, Chat, Messaging, and Broadcasting services.

In 2017, the European Commission began investigating Valve and five other publishers—Bandai Namco Entertainment, Capcom, Focus Home Interactive, Koch Media, and ZeniMax Media—for anti-competitive practices, specifically the use of geo-blocking to prevent access to software within certain countries within the European Economic Area. Such practices would be against the Digital Single Market initiative set by the European Union. The French gaming trade group, Syndicat National du Jeu Vidéo, noted that geo-blocking was a necessary feature to hinder inappropriate product key reselling. The Commission found, in January 2021, that Valve and co-defendants had violated antitrust rules of the European Union, issued combined fines of €7.8 million, and determined that these companies may be further liable to lawsuits from affected consumers. Valve chose "not to cooperate", and was fined €1.6 million, the most of any of the defendants.

A January 2021 class-action lawsuit filed against Valve asserted that it forced developers into entering a "most favored nation"-type of pricing contract to offer games on its storefront, which required the developers to price their games the same on other platforms as they did on Steam, thus stifling competition. Gamasutra's Simon Carless analyzed the lawsuit and observed that Valve's terms only apply the resale of Steam keys and not games themselves, and thus the lawsuit may be without merit.

A separate class-action lawsuit filed against Valve by Wolfire Games in April 2021 asserted that Steam is essentially a monopoly, since developers must sell to PC users through it and that its 30% cut and "most favored nation" pricing practices violate antitrust laws as a result of its position. Valve's response, filed in July 2021, dismissed the complaint stating that it "has no duty under antitrust law to allow developers to use free Steam Keys to undersell prices for the games they sell on Steam—or to provide Steam Keys at all". Valve defended its 30% revenue as meeting the current industry standard and claimed Wolfire's figure for Steam's market share to lack evidence. Wolfire's suit was dismissed by the presiding judge in November 2021 after determining that Wolfire had failed to show that Valve had a monopoly on game sales and that the 30% cut has remained unchanged throughout Valve's history. Wolfire refiled its case, narrowing the complaint to Valve's use of its dominance to intimidate developers that sell their game for less on other marketplaces, which the judge allowed to proceed in May 2022. According to discovery, Valve was ordered to have Gabe Newell submit to a deposition for discussion of Valve's business strategy related to Steam. On November 26, 2024, an order was entered certifying a class of game sellers who were allegedly injured by Valve's policies, and the case is now expected to proceed to trial.

A similar lawsuit as Wolfire's was filed against Valve in the United Kingdom in 2024 as a collective action claim, accusing Valve of its favored pricing model, its high 30% revenue share, and requiring developers to funnel microtransactions for games through Steam's storefront. The case was reviewed by the Competition Appeal Tribunal, which approved the suit to go forward in January 2026. Another similar lawsuit was filed against Valve in June 2026 by the Netherlands' Consumer Competition Claims Foundation, a non-profit consumer rights organization, based on the high revenue share that Valve takes in addition to the favored pricing model.

Valve changed the Steam terms of service in September 2024 to eliminate the forced arbitration clause, such that any disputes with the storefront are to be resolved within courtrooms, and allowing for class-action lawsuits.

=== Others ===
In August 2026, a 12-terabyte collection of files started being distributed among torrent sites. The anonymous user claimed the files were from a publicly-accessible, non-password-protected server related to Valve's older storage solution, and had been available there for some time. The leak includes data from games ranging from 2003 to 2013, which included many of Valve's game prototypes and early builds including from Portal 2, and Left 4 Dead, as well as unreleased titles like Half-Life 2: Episode 3 and F-Stop, and builds from other third-party games that had been on Steam at that time such as Mirror's Edge, and Batman: Arkham Asylum.

Another Steam leak occurred in September 2026, revealing the achievements for a number of unreleased games, several which had yet to be formally announced. The achievement titles provided some context for the details of the games, particularly for games like Persona 6 and Kingdom Hearts IV.

== See also ==
- List of video game digital distribution systems
