= Japan Advanced Semiconductor Manufacturing =

Japanese joint venture enterprise

Japan Advanced Semiconductor Manufacturing, Inc.

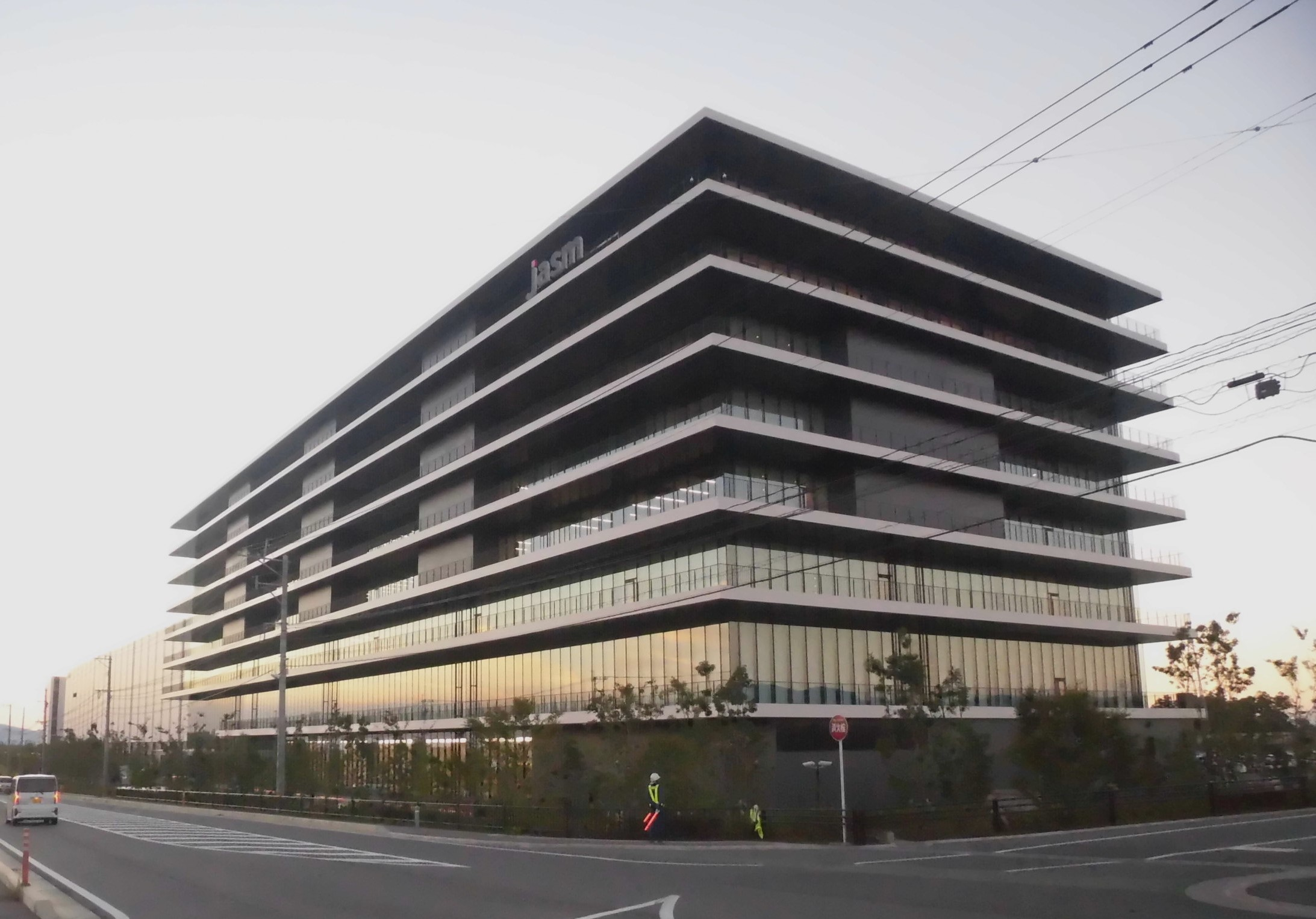
- JASM factory in Kikuyō, Kumamoto
- Industry: Semiconductors
- Founded: 10 December 2021
- Headquarters: Kikuyō, Kumamoto, Japan
- Revenue: ▲$ 462.2 million (FY 2025) (¥ 72.4 billion) (FY 2025)
- Owner: TSMC; Sony Semiconductor Solutions; Denso; Toyota

The Japan Advanced Semiconductor Manufacturing, Inc. (JASM) is a joint-venture, which is majority-owned by Taiwan Semiconductor Manufacturing Company (TSMC) and minority-owned by Sony Semiconductor Solutions, Denso, and Toyota respectively. The company was established to build and operate a US$23 billion semiconductor factory (TSMC Fab 23) in Kikuyo, Kumamoto.

== Operations ==
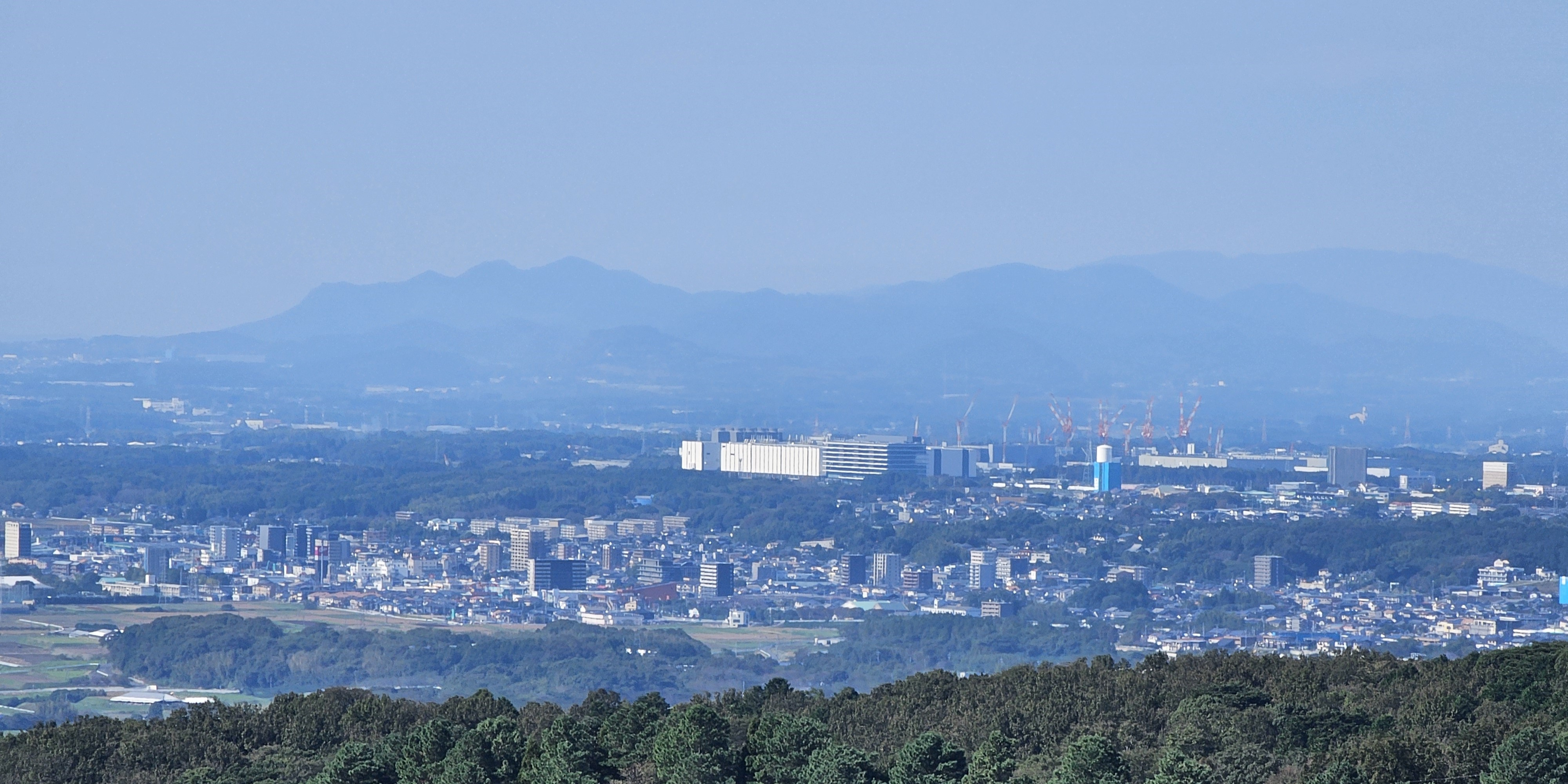
JASM factories in 2024

At the Phase 1 factory, from December 2024, JASM produces semiconductors on 12-inch wafers at a monthly capacity of 55,000 units using 12/16 nm FinFET and 22/28 nm process technologies. The main products are ASICs for image sensors and automotive applications.

In February 2024, TSMC announced that due to increasing demand from foundry customers, the existing fab-complex of JASM (with Phase 1 leading up to production) will be expanded with a second manufacturing location at site (Phase 2). This new facility is scheduled to come online by the end of 2027, with start of construction projected for the end of 2024. This increases the overall investment in the Kumamoto Prefecture, with participation from the Japanese administration, to over $20B USD. It was also announced that car-manufacturer Toyota will actively participate with a stake in the joint-venture.

The Phase 2 factory was under construction as of January 2025, next to the Phase 1 facility, and is expected to be completed by 2027. Initially planned for manufacturing semiconductors using a 6 nm process, 3 nm was incorporated into production plans for 2028 in 2026.

The complete fab-complex, with Phase 1 and Phase 2 active, is scheduled to deliver a capacity of 100k 12-inch wafers/month once fully completed, manufacturing semiconductor-devices and appliances for consumer, automotive and industrial applications and high-performance appliances on 40, 22/28, 12/16 as well as 6/7 nanometer-processes.

== History ==
In May 2019, following large-scale restrictions imposed by the United States on Huawei and heightened tensions between China and Taiwan, officials at Japan's Ministry of Economy, Trade and Industry became concerned that the country might lose access to semiconductors. The semiconductor industry is heavily dependent on social infrastructure, especially electricity and water, making Japan a suitable location. However, the number of domestic companies capable of operating fabs had greatly diminished due to Taiwanese and Korean dominance in the semiconductor industry over the preceding two decades. As a result, efforts began to invite TSMC to build a fabrication plant in Japan.

From late 2020, the 2020–2023 global chip shortage materialised. In April 2021, United States President Joe Biden selected Prime Minister Yoshihide Suga as his first official foreign guest. They discussed worries about semiconductor supply in the event of a contingency involving Taiwan. In response, Members of Parliament Yoshihiro Seki and Akira Amari set up a new parliamentary league to promote semiconductor strategy and strengthen the industry, positioning it as a national priority. Sony, which manufactures its own image sensors, relied on TSMC to produce the logic semiconductors that complement those sensors. Sony's orders accounted for more than half of TSMC's sales in Japan. In July 2020, Sony asked TSMC to establish a dedicated plant for Sony's semiconductors, and TSMC considered setting up a dedicated 28 nm production line (Fab14B) for Sony. Under a subsidy package of about ¥476 billion, the entire plan for Fab14B in Tainan was transferred to Kumamoto.

Kumamoto Prefecture's plan to build an industrial estate in the area spanning Koshi City and Kikuyo Town by 2026 was another factor behind the plant's eventual location. In addition, the Sony Group was prepared to offer about 21 hectares of land adjacent to its Sony Semiconductor Manufacturing Kumamoto Factory for TSMC's use. With regard to groundwater, JASM and Kikuyo Town reached an agreement on the volume of water to be extracted and on cooperation for water quality surveys. Kumamoto Prefecture, where JASM is building its factory, was home to wafer fabs owned by Mitsubishi Electric and NEC beginning in the 1960s, which helped earn Kyushu the name Silicon Island. It developed into a centre of Japan's semiconductor industry, and many Japanese semiconductor firms, including Mitsubishi Electric, Sony, and Tokyo Electron, still have bases in Kumamoto. Kumamoto Airport is in Mashiki Town, which neighbours Kikuyo Town, providing access to Taiwan, Korea, China and other parts of Asia.

== See also ==
- Semiconductor industry in Japan
- Semiconductor industry in Taiwan
