= Chips Act =

Chips Act may refer to:

- CHIPS and Science Act, legislation in the United States enacted in 2022
- European Chips Act, legislation in the European Union enacted in 2023
