= Semiconductor industry in Japan =

Industry in Japan

Japan's semiconductor industry rose with the support of the government, with research starting in the 1960s. Japan rose to hold a majority market share in DRAM by the 1980s. Semiconductor factories largely developed around the capital region and the island of Kyushu. Research and development has historically been concentrated around the capital. Leading Japanese semiconductor companies were established manufacturers of various products before industry-wide restructuring began to occur in the 1990s.

== History ==
Semiconductor research began in Japan in the early 1960s. At the time, government agencies made demands such as technology transfers from foreign companies in the industry seeking access to Japan's market. In the 1970s, the Japanese government actively subsidized research and promoted cooperation in the industry. Japanese firms were also aided by domestic import protection, an overvalued dollar, and favorable terms in accessing capital. As Japanese semiconductor firms were diversified into final systems equipment markets, they focused on supplying in-house demand until the mid-1970s. In 1976, the VLSI Technology Research Association was organized by the Ministry of International Trade and Industry (MITI) for "joint research by five Japanese semiconductor firms" to better serve the computer and telecommunications sectors. More than 1,000 patents resulted from the project.

Japan's lower defect rate and insufficient American capacity contributed to Japan's 40% market share for 16K RAM. The low defect rates have been attributed to less contamination through automation.

There are two main reasons for the higher level of automation in Japan. First, the Japanese industry did not choose to produce offshore in cheap labor nations to the extent that many American companies did. Accordingly, with relatively high-cost labor at home, the economic incentive to automate was greater in Japan. Second, because the Japanese decided to focus on a few products and make vast numbers of them, automation was made easier due to the uniformity of the operation.

Japan entered the 64K RAM market earlier than the US with larger and more "straightforward" chips, which were lower cost and more reliable. By 64K RAM, Japan held a majority of the market share. The share further increased by 256K RAM.

Intended to stop Japanese dumping, the 1986 U.S.–Japan Semiconductor Agreement drove up chip prices and contributed to higher profits for Japanese companies. Japanese companies produced more than half of the semiconductors in the world in 1988.

Though Japan had prevailed over American memory chip makers by the late 1980's, competition among the Japanese firms became tremendous. Hitachi took a lead in early generations, but Toshiba won the 1-megabit chip battle, proving the most adept at building manufacturing capability quickly and solving the myriad problems that lower the "yield," or number of usable chips in each batch produced.

The Japanese asset bubble burst in the early 1990s and led to a credit crunch, leading Japanese firms to reduce capital equipment spending. The decline of the Japanese industry has also been attributed to factors such as overemphasis on quality, overdependence on the domestic market, the country's start-up venture environment, and vertical integration.

In July 1993, a factory in Niihama that made more than half of the world's epoxy resin exploded. The material has been used to package silicon chips and anchor them to circuit boards.

In the late 1990s, Japan's major chip producers began the process of combining operations with each other into companies such as Elpida Memory and Renesas Electronics. Fujitsu "abandoned the DRAM business" in 1999.

Although most of the chip factories were designed with large quakes in mind, the 2011 Tōhoku earthquake caused damage to the semiconductor supply chain in Japan. One of Renesas's factories, for example, was offline for about three months.

Elpida Memory went bankrupt in 2012 and was acquired by Micron Technology. The bankruptcy was the largest failure of a Japanese manufacturer since the end of World War II. In the preceding year, Elpida had been tied with Micron as the third-largest DRAM makers in the world.

Toshiba Memory, which was the second-biggest NAND producer in the world, was sold in 2018 to a consortium that included South Korean chipmaker SK Hynix. SK Hynix, however, was restricted from accessing Toshiba Memory's proprietary information.

The investment in Rapidus is smaller than the tens of billions of dollars in capital expenditure by advanced chip makers in a single year.

In 2022, various Japanese companies partnered with the Japanese government to create a semiconductor venture called Rapidus. After a research phase, Rapidus aimed to eventually operate as a logic chip contract manufacturer.

== Silicon Island ==
Kyushu has been called Japan's "Silicon Island" due to its position as a semiconductor industry hub. The industry was drawn to Kyushu due to its female labor availability, water resources, hydropower, air transport access, and cheap land. Mitsubishi Electric started operating Kyushu's first semiconductor factory in 1967. The next year, NEC opened the world's largest semiconductor factory at the time on the island. NEC produced about 80% of its 64K RAMs at its three Kyushu plants.

In the mid-1980s, Kyushu's semiconductor production ranked third in the world. However, semiconductor production on the island declined amidst foreign competition. Kyushu also lost advantages when etching processes stopped needing pure water and when automation for dust control reduced reliance on inexpensive labor. The broader usage of jet airplanes also reduced the benefit of Kyushu's five regional airports. In addition, the stronger yen as well as the new foundry and fabless production process also contributed to the closing of all DRAM factories in Kyushu. Semiconductor firms on the island largely shifted to ASICs.

In 2022, the Ministry of Economy, Trade and Industry announced subsidies for the construction of a joint foundry in Kumamoto Prefecture by TSMC, Sony, and Denso. The plant was framed as a revival of Kyushu's "Silicon Island" title.
