= Rapidus =

Japanese technology corporation

Rapidus Corporation

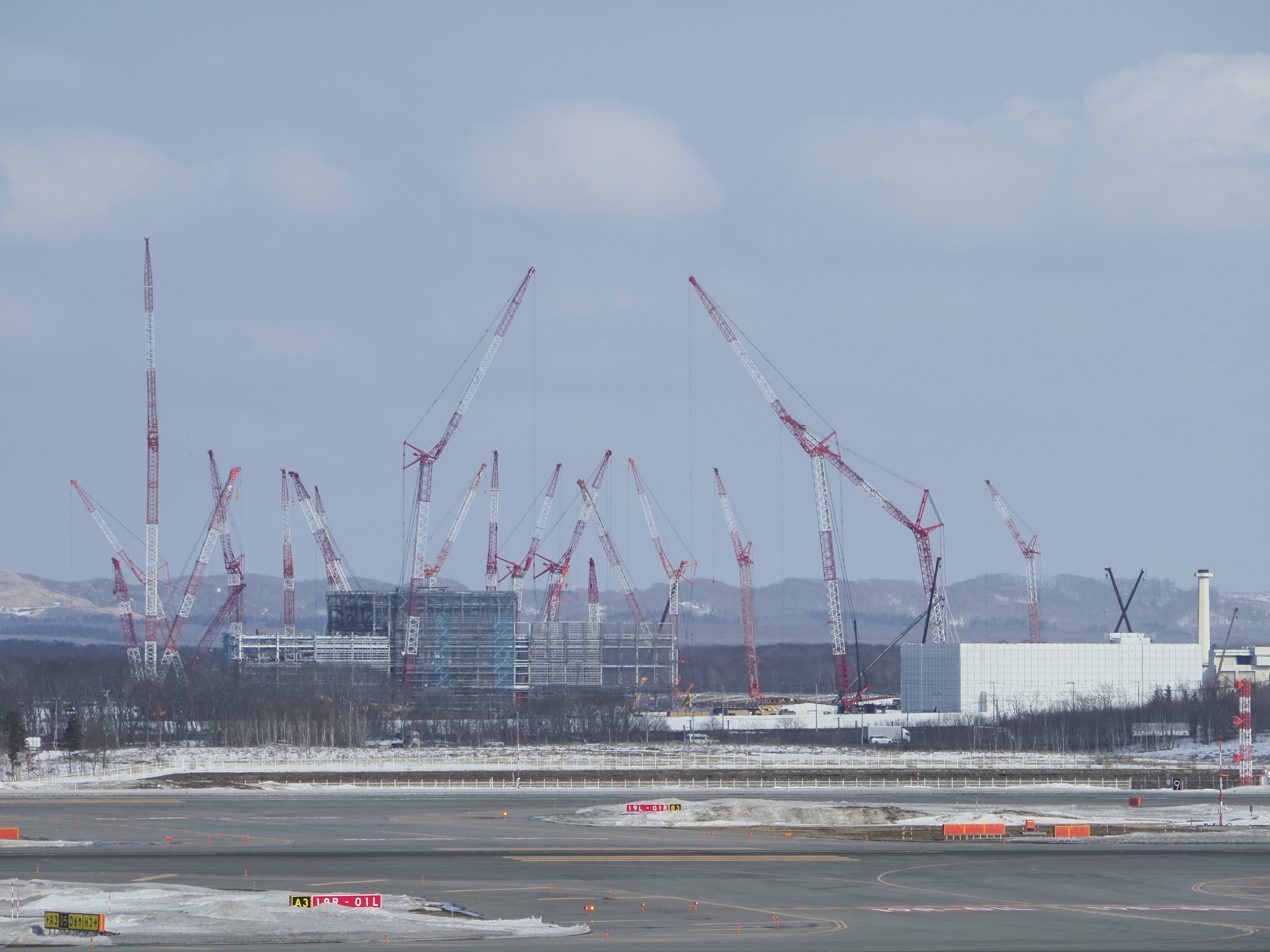
- Rapidus factory under construction in March 2024
- Trade name: Rapidus
- Native name: Rapidus株式会社
- Type: Private KK
- Industry: Semiconductor industry
- Founded: August 10, 2022; 4 years ago in Tokyo, Japan
- Headquarters: Chiyoda, Tokyo, Japan
- Key people: Tetsuro Higashi (Chairman); Atsuyoshi Koike (President and CEO)
- Owner: Government of Japan (40%)
- Website: www.rapidus.inc

Rapidus Corporation (Japanese: Rapidus株式会社, Hepburn: Rapidus Kabushiki-gaisha) is a semiconductor manufacturer headquartered in Chiyoda, Tokyo, Japan. Rapidus was established in August 2022 with the support of eight major Japanese companies: Denso, Kioxia, MUFG Bank, NEC, NTT, SoftBank, Sony, and Toyota. The goal of Rapidus is to increase advanced semiconductor manufacturing capacity with a 2 nm process by 2027.

== Background history ==
The semiconductor industry in Japan was highly competitive in the 1980s, with a global share reaching 50%. However, the 1986 U.S.–Japan Semiconductor Agreement concluded to resolve trade friction and the rise of South Korea and Taiwan gradually reduced competitiveness. In 1999, Elpida Memory was established by integrating the businesses of Hitachi and NEC for DRAM, one of the semiconductors for memory, and later took over the business of Mitsubishi Electric, and at one point acquired the world's third-largest market share in this field. However, management deteriorated due to the 2008 financial crisis and the subsequent strong yen induced recession, and although support was provided with government funds, it went bankrupt in 2012. Elpida was acquired by Micron Technology in 2013, and changed its name to Micron Memory Japan in 2014. Due to international competition from companies including TSMC, Samsung Electronics, and Intel, the share of Japanese companies in the semiconductor industry as a whole has fallen to 10% as of 2019.

In May 2022, United States President Joe Biden and Japanese Prime Minister Fumio Kishida met in Tokyo and discussed increased collaboration on important technologies, including semiconductors, nuclear power, space exploration, electric batteries, critical minerals, and supply chains. The Second Kishida Cabinet's basic policy (Honebuto no hōshin) announced on 7 June 2022 included consideration of support for private companies developing next-generation advanced technologies and the establishment of a design and manufacturing infrastructure for next-generation semiconductors in the latter half of the 2020s. On 29 July 2022, high-level talks were held between the United States and Japan by U.S. Secretary of State Antony Blinken, U.S. Commerce Secretary Gina Raimondo, Japanese Foreign Minister Yoshimasa Hayashi and Japanese Trade Minister Koichi Hagiuda to discuss collaboration for semiconductors development. In addition, Prime Minister Fumio Kishida's policy speech at the 210th session of the Diet on 3 October 2022 included digital transformation (DX) by encouraging public and private investment, and announced that it would promote the technological development and mass production of next-generation semiconductors through Japan-U.S. collaboration. The Ministry of Economy, Trade and Industry (METI) has decided to establish the Leading-edge Semiconductor Technology Center (LSTC) as an organization to conduct next-generation semiconductor research in anticipation of joint research between the two countries based on the basic principles of semiconductor cooperation between Japan and the United States agreed on in May. LSTC and Rapidus collaborate to establish a design and manufacturing platform for next-generation semiconductors in Japan.

== Company history ==
=== 2022 ===
On 10 August 2022, Rapidus was established by eight Japanese companies with total investment of 7.3 billion yen for domestic production of advanced semiconductors; with further investments totaling $36 billion expected over a decade. Rapidus is led by Tetsuro Higashi (who formerly led Tokyo Electron) and Atsuyoshi Koike (who formerly led Western Digital's Japanese subsidiary). In the same year, METI and the New Energy and Industrial Technology Development Organization (NEDO) publicly solicited applications for advanced semiconductor development consignment projects related to strengthening the foundation of post-5G communication systems, which resulted in 70 billion yen of government subsidies for Rapidus.

On 6 December 2022, the Belgium-based Interuniversity Microelectronics Centre (IMEC) announced it had signed a Memorandum of Cooperation with Rapidus, where both companies will set up a long-term and sustainable collaboration on advanced semiconductor technologies, while Rapidus would plan to mass-produce chips in 2-nanometer technology in Japan in the latter half of 2020s.

On 13 December 2022, IBM and Rapidus announced the development of 2 nanometer node technology, with production of the nanosheet gate-all-around FET (GAA FET) devices previously announced by IBM in 2021 to be done by Rapidus at its fab in Japan. The 2 nm semiconductor chips which Rapidus is aiming to produce are expected to have up to 45% better performance and use 75% less energy compared to 7 nm chips on the market in 2022.

=== 2023 ===
In January 2023, representatives of Rapidus and IBM participated in a meeting between Japanese Trade Minister Hagiuda's successor, Yasutoshi Nishimura, and Secretary Raimondo.

In February 2023, Rapidus announced the selection of a site close to the New Chitose Airport in Chitose, Hokkaido for the location of its planned factory. Rapidus also increased its partnership with IMEC by joining the latter's "Core Partner Program" in April 2023, and in the same month received additional funding of 260 billion yen from the Japanese government. An estimated $37 billion in total funding is needed before Rapidus can begin production.

In July 2023, Rapidus and Tokyo Electron were discussed as companies that would "play a major role" in a new memorandum of understanding between Japan and India that is expected to involve $35.9 billion of investment by Japan in India by 2027 and was officially signed in New Delhi by ministers Yasutoshi Nishimura and Ashwini Vaishnaw for their countries respectively. This agreement closely followed a similar deal between the United States and India which had been reached by President Joe Biden and Prime Minister Narendra Modi in June.

Groundbreaking to begin construction on Rapidus' factory in Chitose was held in September 2023. The company has reportedly been supported by around US$2.5 billion in government subsidies from the Kishida administration thus far. Dutch equipment manufacturer ASML Holding announced they would also open an office in Chitose with 40-50 technical staff to assist Rapidus. While full operation is not expected until 2027, a pilot line is expected to start in 2025.

On 17 November 2023, Rapidus signed an agreement with the AI computing company Tenstorrent Inc. from Toronto, Canada.

=== 2024 ===
On January 22, 2024, Rapidus opened a Chitose office to handle communications and contracts with construction companies and equipment delivery companies related to factory construction. The address is "NTT Chitose Building, 2-16 Chiyodacho, Chitose City, Hokkaido".

According to a February 27, 2024 Bloomberg article, Rapidus announced that it has been contracted to produce next-generation AI chips from Canadian startup Tenstorrent. Tenstorrent is the first customer announced by Rapidus. The architecture that Tenstorrent outsourced to Rapidus for production and development is based on RISC-V, and its benefits are close to what the university stakeholders, who are the main members of Japan's Leading-edged Semiconductor Technology Center (LSTC), desire (because of its open Instruction set architecture). Furthermore, the biggest challenge in the relevant architecture is said to be the optimization of the calculation pipeline, and maximizing microfabrication technology is also an important issue in order to realize a multi-stage pipeline.

On April 2, the Ministry of Economy Trade and Industry of Japan announced that it would provide up to JP ¥590 billion in additional support to Rapidus. Including the JP ¥330 billion in subsidies that have already been decided, the total amount of support will reach nearly JP ¥1 trillion.

On April 11, the company announced the establishment of a new company, Rapidus Design Solutions, in Silicon Valley, United States. Henri Richard was appointed president. In addition to selling to major American IT companies, Rapidus Design Solutions (RDS) aim to secure software and design engineers to create semiconductors that meet customer requests. The expansion of RDS in the U.S. is also to build upon Rapidus's already existing presence there, with it having more than 100 engineers and scientists working at the Albany NanoTech Complex facility in New York.

In November 2024, the new government under Shigeru Ishiba announced US$65 billion in government funding through 2030 to support the semiconductor industry, with much of it allocated for Rapidus.

=== 2025 ===
The Japanese government allocated 802.5 billion yen (US$5.4 billion) in subsidies for Rapidus in fiscal year 2025.

Pilot line testing began on April 1. Rapidus unveiled a 300 mm wafer containing their first 2nm prototypes on July 18; the density of Rapidus' 2nm chips are reportedly 237.31 MTr/mm².

=== 2026 ===
In April, the Japanese government allocated 631.5 billion yen (US$3.96 billion) in additional funding to Rapidus. Mass production of 2nm wafers is expected to begin in late 2027.

== See also ==
- Semiconductor industry in Japan
