= María Marced =

Spanish telecommunications engineer

Maria Marced
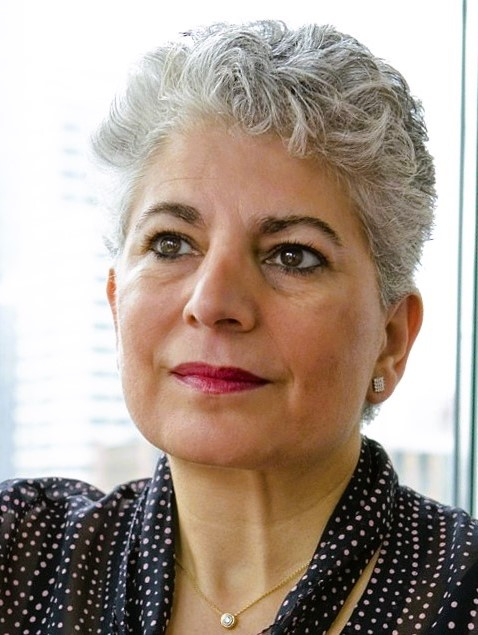
- Born: Spain
- Occupation: Telecommunications Engineering
- Known for: microelectronics
- Notable work: TSMC, Intel, European Chips Act

María Marced, born María Ángeles Marced Martín, (Valencia, Spain) is an executive manager and director, telecommunications engineer specialized in microelectronics.

== Biography ==
She holds a master's degree in Telecommunications Engineering from the Polytechnic University of Madrid and a PhD in Telecommunications Engineering from the same university. After completing her academic training, she has developed her professional career in various technology companies, including Telefónica, Intel, Fujitsu, Philips, NXP Semiconductors and TSMC.

In 2000 she was appointed Vice President of the Worldwide Sales and Marketing Group and Co-General Manager of Intel EMEA after having worked at this company since 1984 as a field applications engineer in Spain.

Marced served as president of Taiwan Semiconductor Manufacturing Company (TSMC), a global semiconductor and integrated circuit manufacturing company, in Europe from 2007 to December 2023. In addition, since 2013, she has also been chair of the EMEA Leadership Council of the Global Semiconductor Alliance (GSA).

Since 2023, it has been part of the Expert Group of the Strategic Project (PERTE) CHIP in Spain, a working group created by the Spanish Ministry of Economic Affairs and Digital Transformation to strengthen the design and production capabilities of the Spanish microelectronics and semiconductor industry.

In 2026, she served as chair of the European semiconductor industry's Industry Advisory Group (IAG) for the second European Chip Act, aiming to focus the European strategy on stimulating demand, increasing resilience, and improving framework conditions. She succeeded in having these actions included in the proposal approved by the European Commission in June 2026.

== Awards ==
In 1992, Marced was nominated for the European Woman Award, presented by the European Commission. A decade later, in February 2002, she was named one of the three most powerful businesswomen in Europe by The Wall Street Journal, and in May 2002 she received the Outstanding Figure Award at the 4th Valencian Telecommunications Night, presented by the Official College of Telecommunications Engineers (COIT) of the Valencian Community and the Valencia City Council, in recognition of her professional career.

In May 2024, she was recognized with the "Global Industry Leader Award 2024" at the ChipEx-2024 international microelectronics trade fair organized in Israel in consortium with the Semiconductor Industry Association and the Technion Institute of Technology. In August 2024, the foundation stone was laid in Dresden for the first factory of ESMC, the European subsidiary of TSMC, whose creation was driven by María Marced. In September 2024, she was recognized by the Official College of Telecommunications Engineers (COIT) for her professional career as a telecommunications engineer. In December 2024, in Valencia, her hometown, she received the honorary Ier VLC Chipcity Night Award for her entire career in the field of chips and semiconductors. In December 2024, the Valencia City Council appointed him VLC Ambassador in its initiative to promote the city "as a benchmark for investment, innovation and tourism". In May 2025, the College of Telecommunications Engineers of Eastern Andalusia and Melilla recognized her with its Professional Career Award. In October 2025, at the "Valencia Digital Summit", she was awarded the 'VDS City of Valencia' prize for his outstanding contribution to the technology ecosystem.
