= Leading-edge Semiconductor Technology Center =

Government-funded semiconductor research organisation in Japan

Leading-edge Semoconductor Technology Center
- Formation: December 21, 2022; 2 years ago
- Headquarters: Chiyoda, Tokyo
- Chairman: Tetsuro Higashi
- Academic leader: Makoto Gonokami
- Website: https://www.lstc.jp/index.html

The Leading-edge Semiconductor Technology Center is a semiconductor research institution based in Japan. It is funded by the Ministry of Economy, Trade and Industry and was established in December 2022.

The organisation's primary goal as of 2024 is to establish a domestic semiconductor industry ecosystem by developing design, device, manufacturing, and equipment/material technologies for product realisation in collaboration with domestic and international institutions, using the 2 nm process node manufacturing technology and pilot line under development with short TAT (turnaround time). In February 2024, it was announced that the organisation would receive an additional 45 billion yen research grant from the Ministry of Economy, Trade, and Industry.

== Member organisations ==
- Rapidus
- University of Tokyo
- Tokyo Institute of Technology
- Tohoku University
- National Institute for Materials Science
- RIKEN
- National Institute of Advanced Industrial Science and Technology
- University of Tsukuba
- High Energy Accelerator Research Organization
- Nagoya University
- Osaka University
- Hokkaido University
- Hiroshima University
- Kyushu University
