= 2020–2023 global chip shortage =

Economic shortage caused by demand for semiconductor chips exceeding supply

Between 2020 and 2023, there was a worldwide chip shortage affecting more than 169 industries, which led to major price increases, long queues, and reselling among consumers and manufacturers for automobiles, graphics cards, video game consoles, computers, household appliances, and other consumer electronics that require integrated circuits (commonly called "chips").

From early 2020, the effects of and the mitigation of the COVID-19 pandemic caused disruptions in supply chains and logistics which, coupled with a 13% increase in global demand for PCs owing to some countries' shift to a stay-at-home economy, impacted the availability of key chips necessary for the manufacturing of a broad range of electronics. The pandemic's impact on the manufacture of semiconductors in South Korea and Taiwan was cited as a cause for the shortage, with constrained supply impacting industries as broad as console gaming and the automotive industry.

In February 2021, markets analyst IHS Markit forecasted the shortages to last through to the third quarter of 2021. Lead times on chip supply at this time had already extended to 15 weeks, the longest lead time since 2017. By April 2021, lead times for semiconductors from Broadcom Inc. had "extended to 22.2 weeks, up from 12.2 weeks in February 2020".

Severe weather events including the droughts in Taiwan during the summer of 2021 could also be a significant contributing factor. The droughts threatened to affect the production due to the lack of available ultrapure water that is needed to clean the factories and wafers.

At the end of Quarter 1 of 2021, used car prices in some countries were increasing due to the demand from both economic recovery, as well as the chip shortage. The price of some cars increased as much as 10% in Q1. By 2023, the automotive industry largely recovered with global car production up 3%. In the same year, the global chip shortage had mostly subsided.

== Causes ==
The global chip crisis was due to a combination of different events described as a perfect storm with the snowball effect of the COVID-19 pandemic being the primary reason for accelerating shortages. Another contributing factor was that demand is so great that existing production capacity is unable to keep up. Other causes have been attributed to the China–United States trade war and the 2021 drought in Taiwan.

=== COVID-19 pandemic ===
An increase in remote work and remote learning caused a surge in demand for computers, network peripherals, and other consumer electronics with chips. Due to lockdowns, chip production facilities were shut down, leading to the depletion of inventories. In the fourth quarter of 2020, traditional computer sales saw a 26.1% growth over the previous year.

=== China–United States trade war ===
In September 2020, as part of the economic conflict between China and the United States, the US Department of Commerce imposed restrictions on China's largest chip manufacturer, Semiconductor Manufacturing International Corporation (SMIC), which made it harder for them to sell to companies with American ties. These restrictions forced companies to use other manufacturing plants like Taiwan Semiconductor Manufacturing Company Limited (TSMC) and Samsung. However, these companies were already producing at maximum capacity.

In 2020, GlobalFoundries, a U.S.-based chipmaker and AMD's semiconductor manufacturing arm before its IPO, ceased operations at its only Chinese plant. The fab was supposed to produce 300 mm wafers, but the 65,000-square-meter factory in Beijing never began production.

In October 2022, the United States announced they would introduce further measures in restricting sales of computer chip technology to Chinese companies, primarily affecting sales of advanced chips necessary for cutting-edge technologies. As a result, the shares of major Asian chipmaker companies slumped during the reopening of stock markets in Taiwan, Japan, and South Korea after public holidays.

In October 2022, Washington mandated that companies using US software or hardware must obtain licenses before exporting chips to China. This is regardless of their country of origin. The US also urged Japan and the Netherlands to implement similar regulations.

=== Cryptocurrency ===
The increased use of proof-of-work cryptocurrencies led to a large amount of mining, done primarily with general-purpose graphics processing units (GPGPUs). The high demand for GPUs for cryptocurrency mining reduced their availability for other uses.

=== Severe weather ===
A severe winter storm in February 2021 forced the closure of three plants in Austin, Texas, owned by Samsung, Infineon, and NXP Semiconductors, due to loss of electricity. This set back supply from these plants by several months.

Taiwan is the leader of the global semiconductor industry, with TSMC alone accounting for more than 50% of the global wafer foundry market in 2020. In 2021, Taiwan experienced its worst drought in more than half a century, leading to problems among chip manufacturers that use large amounts of ultra-pure water to clean their factories and wafers. For example, TSMC's facilities used more than 63,000 tons of water a day, more than 10% of the supply of two local reservoirs.

=== Fires at facilities ===
An Asahi Kasei semiconductor plant which specializes in ADC and DAC components caught fire in October 2020. Another Japanese factory owned by Renesas Electronics, which supplies 30% of the global market for microcontroller units used in cars, caught fire in March 2021; Renesas said it would take at least 100 days for them to get back to normal production. In January 2022, a fire from the Berlin plant of ASML affected the production of EUV lithography equipment used in chip production.

=== Russia–Ukraine war ===
The price of neon, a noble gas needed for lasers in chip manufacture, increased sixfold between December 2021 and March 2022 due to the COVID-19 pandemic and war in Ukraine. The supply of neon was severely constrained by the Russian invasion of Ukraine, sparking fears that the conflict could worsen the chip shortage. Ukraine produces about half of the global neon supply as a byproduct of the Russian steel industry, and 90% of the semiconductor-grade neon used in the United States. Semiconductor manufacturers have searched for alternative suppliers, such as noble-gas manufacturers in China, but any new supplier would take at least nine months to increase production. The supply of krypton and xenon, of which Ukraine is also a major exporter, was affected as well.

Russia exports about 40% of the global supply of the metal palladium, used in certain chip components, and the supply of palladium could be affected by trade sanctions imposed by Western governments.

== Impacted industries ==
According to an analysis by Goldman Sachs, at least 169 industries have been impacted by the global chip shortage, with the automotive and consumer electronics industries among the most affected by the crisis.

=== Cars ===
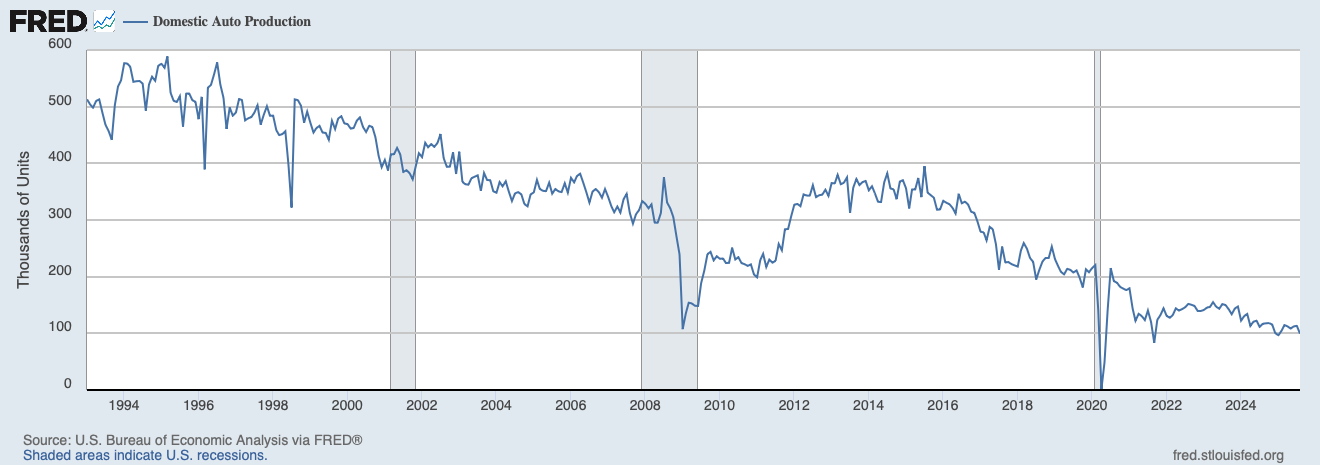
U.S. automobile production, 1993–2025

The average modern car can have between 1,400 and 1,500 chips, some even up to 3,000. Cars account for 15% of global chip consumption, while personal electronics account for around 50%. Chip revenues are even more skewed towards non-automotive sectors. The chip shortage was expected to cost the global automotive industry US$210 billion in revenue in 2021, 2.5m more automobiles were sold in 2021 vs 2020. As of 2024, automotive units sold had not recovered to pre-pandemic levels. Despite lower sales, some manufacturers increased profits over 2020, as Toyota and General Motors, for example, saw record profits for 2021, due to resilient demand and decreased financial incentives offered to buyers.

At the start of the pandemic, car manufacturers incorrectly predicted that sales would drop, canceled chip orders, and were unprepared to meet demand. Chip manufacturers had more commitments from the IT sector, which reduced capacity for car chips. Ford parked thousands of unfinished vehicles at Kentucky Speedway as the company waited for chips to finish assembling those cars. Toyota planned to cut vehicle production worldwide by 40% in September 2021, while General Motors announced it would halt production of almost all cars at its North American plants for a week or two that same month. During the third quarter of 2021, there were only two-thirds as many new car sales in the United States as there had been during the same time period in 2020, as supply could not meet demand. Opel closed its Eisenach manufacturing plant until 2022 because of the shortage, causing 1,300 workers to be temporarily laid off. In mid-2022 Automotive manufacturing corporation Stellantis paused production at two plants in France claiming a lack of semiconductors.

=== Desktop computers and graphics cards ===
The availability of virtually all components required to build a desktop computer has been greatly impacted by the global chip shortage. The two main manufacturers of CPU chips, AMD and Intel, have struggled to keep up with the rising demand of their products as a result of the global pandemic. Furthermore, the global chip shortage has made it difficult to acquire graphics cards, with the availability of new and used graphics processing unit (GPU) cards being further worsened by an increase in cryptocurrency mining in 2021. Furthermore, AMD and Nvidia, the leading manufacturers of GPU cards, both released new models of their flagship cards during the pandemic; these newer models were in extremely high demand, and rarely found in stock. Furthermore, scalpers often utilize Internet bots to automatically buy out a retailer's stock in a matter of seconds. These cards are then resold with the price marked up to 300% above the manufacturer's suggested retail price (MSRP).

However, pricing for GPUs has begun to go back to MSRP due to Ether (one of the most used cryptocurrencies, second to Bitcoin by market capitalization) undergoing a consensus mechanism change dubbed "The Merge", which changed it from proof-of-work (PoW) to the more efficient proof-of-stake (PoS) around 15 September 2022. This, combined with the release of Nvidia's GeForce RTX 40 series GPUs, alongside decreasing cryptomining profitability as the coin prices plummeted, resulted in cryptominers offloading their used cards to the market.

=== Video game consoles ===
During the COVID-19 pandemic, cinemas and theaters were closed to prevent the spread of the virus, leading many people to turn to home entertainment during periods of self-isolation, which increased the demand for video game consoles. With the release of the ninth generation of video game consoles coinciding with the pandemic, demand increased even further, with both Microsoft and Sony reporting record demand for their new consoles. Microsoft expected in February 2021 that shortages of the Xbox Series X and Series S would continue until at least mid-2021, while Sony warned in May 2021 that short supply of the PlayStation 5 console would continue into 2022. Both companies use AMD chips manufactured by TSMC in their ninth-generation consoles, which puts extra strain on the supply chain. As supply problems persisted, scalpers resold the consoles on websites such as eBay for 50–100% above their retail price. Nintendo made 20% fewer Switch consoles. The company originally planned to produce as many as 30 million units, but was only able to produce 24 million through their fiscal year, which was until March 2022.

=== Credit and other IC cards ===
Modern credit cards have EMV chips used for contactless payments. The shortage caused the typical replacement time for a credit card in the U.S. to increase from ten business days to six to eight weeks.

In June 2023, Japanese railway operators JR East and Tokyo Metro decided to temporarily suspend sales on Suica and PASMO cards, initially unregistered ones, then completely except for commuter passes, cards for children, and time-limited variants for foreign tourists.

== Reactions ==
=== Governments ===
On February 24, 2021, U.S. President Joe Biden signed an executive order trying to address the chip shortage by reviewing options to strengthen the semiconductor supply chain. Later in April, CEOs of major technology companies and U.S. government officials attended a virtual summit with the White House to talk about improving the resilience of the semiconductor supply chain. In a virtual meeting on September 23, 2021, which followed another meeting in May, the White House pressed automakers, chip manufacturers and others to provide information on the ongoing crisis that has forced cuts to U.S. automobile production, and to take the lead in helping solve it.

On September 15, 2021, President of the European Commission Ursula von der Leyen trailed a forthcoming European Chips Act in her State of the Union address. It was announced that the European Union will use legislation to push for greater resilience and sovereignty in regional semiconductor supply chains.

In December 2021, India outlined a plan to boost its chip manufacturing base.

US Congress passed the CHIPS Act in summer 2022 and on August 9, 2022, President Biden signed the bill into law. The bill is focused on domestic manufacturing, research and national security, providing $52.7 billion in subsidies and tax credits for companies that manufacture chips in the United States. It also includes $200 billion for new manufacturing initiatives and scientific research.

In January 2023, the U.S., Japan, and the Netherlands reached an agreement to limit certain advanced chip exports to China.

In March 2023, the Japanese government intends to impose restrictions on the export of computer chip-making equipment. This move follows similar actions previously taken by the Netherlands and the US. It is expected to take effect in July 2023. However, Yasutoshi Nishimura, Japanese trade minister, emphasized that this plan is not related to that of the US's move. This restriction will impact 23 types of tools used in semiconductor production, ranging from immersion lithography machines to silicon wafer cleaners. Moreover, among the major technology businesses to be affected are Nikon and Tokyo Electron.

On 6 September 2024, The Dutch government expanded export licensing for ASML's chipmaking equipment, aligning with U.S. efforts to restrict China's access to advanced technology.

=== Companies ===
On July 22, 2021, Intel CEO Pat Gelsinger said he expects the chip shortage will get worse in the second half of 2021 and that it will be a year or two before supplies return to normal. On August 19, 2021, Jensen Huang, then CEO of Nvidia, said he expects the shortage to continue well into 2022, while AMD CEO Lisa Su said on September 27, 2021, that the shortage would improve throughout the second half of 2022, though she warned that supply would remain tight until then. However, IBM CEO Arvind Krishna said on October 11 that any prediction of a resolution to the chip shortage by the end of 2022 is optimistic, and that he sees it "more likely" that the issue will not be fully solved until 2023 or 2024.

On September 24, 2021, Taiwan's TSMC said it is actively supporting and working with all stakeholders to overcome the global chip crisis, after its participation at the White House virtual meeting on September 23. Earlier in April 2021, TSMC announced that it plans to invest US$100 billion over the next three years to increase capacity at its plants, days after Intel announced a US$20 billion plan to expand its advanced chip making capacity in Arizona. Already in May 2020, TSMC announced its US$12 billion plan to build and operate a semiconductor fab in Arizona, their second manufacturing site in the United States. Construction is underway as of June 2021, with chip production targeted to begin in 2024.

In December 2022, TSMC announced it would triple its investment in its Arizona plant to a total of $40 billion. The start of chip production at the first factory was pushed back to 2025, while the second factory is expected to be operational by 2027 or 2028. On April 8, 2024, the United States Department of Commerce awarded TSMC a $6.6 billion subsidy for advanced semiconductor production in Phoenix, Arizona and up to $5 billion in low-cost government loans. TSMC agreed to expand its planned investment by $25 billion to $65 billion and to add a third factory by 2030. The Arizona plant started producing 4-nanometer chips by January 2025.

On November 9, 2021, TSMC announced a partnership deal with Sony (Sony Semiconductor Solutions Corporation) for a new $7 billion chip factory in Kumamoto, Japan. The plant will produce 22-nanometer and 28-nanometer chips to address strong global demand for specialty chip technologies. Construction on the factory began in 2022. The factory opened two years later in February 2024. In the same month, TSMC announced it will open a second manufacturing plant in Japan with backing from Sony and automaker Toyota. The second factory is expected to be operational by 2027.

On September 20, 2021, the CEO of U.S. automaker General Motors, Mary Barra, said that the chip shortage has forced a supply chain rethink. Barra said that the company will source more semiconductors directly from chip manufacturers instead of suppliers to adapt to the ongoing global chip shortage. In February 2023, General Motors reached a deal with chipmaker GlobalFoundries to dedicate part of an upstate New York factory to supply the automaker and avoid future chip shortage disruptions. Other major automakers that also formed partnership deals with semiconductor suppliers include Ford with GlobalFoundries in November 2021, BMW with INOVA Semiconductors and GlobalFoundries in December 2021, Honda with TSMC in April 2023, Stellantis with Foxconn in June 2023, as well as Hyundai and Kia with Infineon in October 2023.

ASML Holding, the largest supplier for the semiconductor industry and the sole supplier of extreme ultraviolet lithography photolithography machines to produce the most advanced computer chips, has been profiting from the chip shortage.

On November 29, 2021, Nissan CEO, Makoto Uchida, told the BBC it was too early to say when normal deliveries of microchips, and therefore finished cars, would resume.

On January 17, 2023, ABB chairman Peter Voser told CNBC that he believes the worst of the chip supply crunch has subsided and added that slowing growth has helped balance out supply and demand.

== See also ==
- 2025–present global memory supply shortage
