= TSMC Arizona =

Semiconductor factory

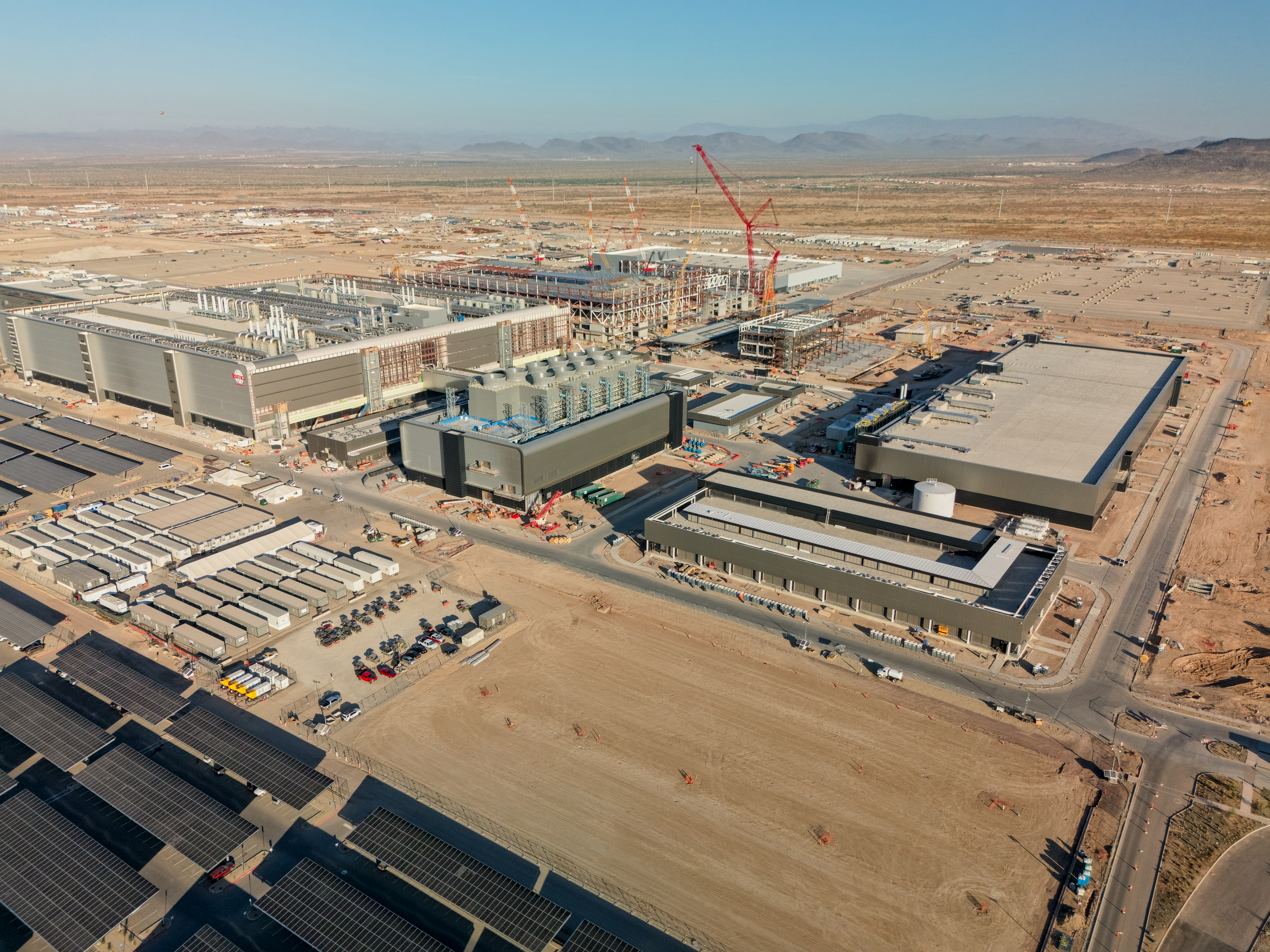
- Fab 21 construction (2023)
- Location: 5088 West Innovation Circle, Phoenix; Phoenix, Arizona
- Coordinates: 33.78°N 112.16°W
- Industry: Semiconductor
- Products: integrated circuits; wafers; Apple A16; Apple S9; AMD Ryzen 9000
- Owner: TSMC
- Website: Official website

TSMC Arizona is a semiconductor manufacturing complex in Phoenix, Arizona, United States built by TSMC. Its chip fabrication plants are the first built in the United States and with a total US$ 265 billion pledged, it is one of the largest foreign direct investments into the country's manufacturing.

As of 2025, the first fab has been completed and is producing four-nanometer (nm) chips. Production for 3 nm and 2 nm chips is targeted for 2027 and 2029, respectively. TSMC expects that at completion, TSMC Arizona will have a "gigafab" cluster composed of at least ten fabs, two advanced packaging facilities, and a research and development center.

== History ==
In 2020, TSMC announced a planned fab (Fab 21) in Phoenix, Arizona, intended to begin production by 2024 at a rate of 20,000 wafers per month. At that time, TSMC announced that it would bring its newest 5 nm process to the Arizona facility, a significant break from its prior practice of limiting US fabs to older technologies. The Arizona plant was estimated to not be fully operational until 2024, when the 5 nm process is projected to be replaced by TSMC's 3 nm process as the latest technology. At launch it was expected to be the most advanced fab in the United States. TSMC planned to spend $12 billion on the project over eight years, beginning in 2021. TSMC claimed the complex would create 1,900 full-time jobs.

In December 2022, TSMC announced its plans to triple its investment in the Arizona plants in response to the growing tensions between the US and China and the supply chain disruption that has led to chip shortages. In that same month, TSMC stated that they were running into major cost issues, because the cost of construction of buildings and facilities in the US is four to five times what an identical plant would cost in Taiwan, (due to higher costs of labor, red tape, and training), as well as difficulty finding qualified personnel (for which it has hired US workers and sent them for training in Taiwan for 12–18 months.) These additional production costs will increase the cost of TSMC's chips made in the US to at least 50 percent more than the cost of chips made in Taiwan. The US Commerce Department later agreed to provide $6.6 billion in direct funding and up to $5 billion in loans to TSMC for the purposes of creating semiconductor manufacturing facilities in Arizona under the CHIPS and Science Act.

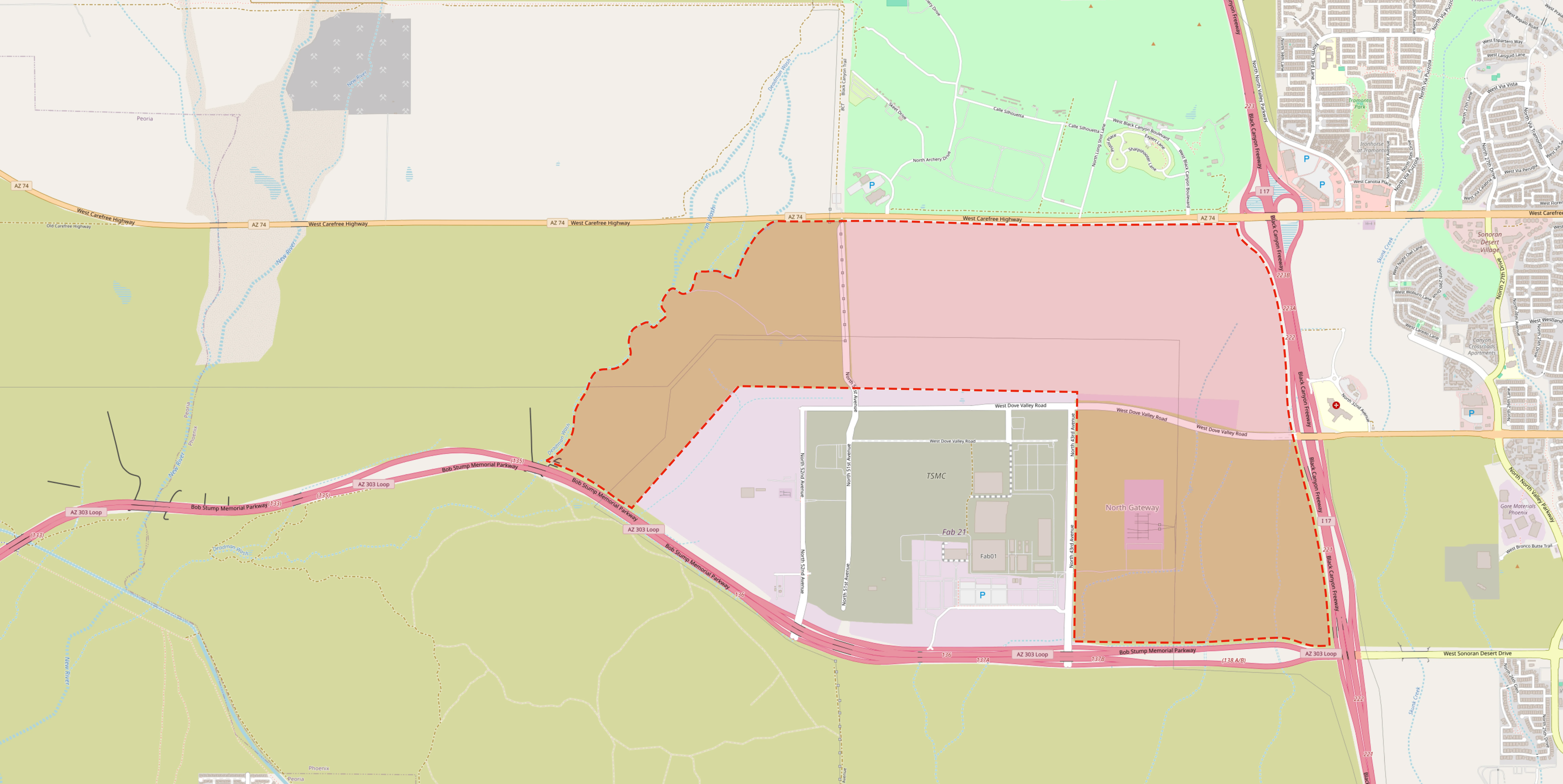
Halo Vista development area

In October 2024 it was revealed that development around the TSMC plants would be called Halo Vista, that will develop 3,500 acres of property from restaurants, hotels, housing, and other Mixed-use development. There will also be a Sonoran Oasis Research and Technology Park that will also help set up the supply chain and foster innovative development, much like how Hsinchu Science Park is to TSMC in Taiwan.

As of March 2025 planned investment had been increased by $100 billion from $65 billion to $165 billion, and the number of planned fabs at the TSMC Arizona site increased from three to six. Additionally, two advanced packaging lines and an R&D center are to be part of the gigafab.

In July 2025, Wei indicated that the company would speed up its production timelines on multiple manufacturing facilities following an additional $100 billion investment in Arizona. He stated that the completion of a "gigafab" cluster totaling six facilities would account for 30 percent of TSMC's 2-nanometer and more advanced capacity semiconductor production within the state.

In July 2026, TSMC announced a further $100 billion investment in Arizona to build at least four more fabs for 2 nm and below technologies as well as advanced packaging facilities, bringing the total amount pledged to $265 billion.

== Production ==
Extreme ultraviolet lithography production equipment is sourced from ASML Holding. Further key suppliers for production equipment include Applied Materials, ASM, Lam Research, KLA and Tokyo Electron as per a 2022 press release from TSMC. TSMC holds additional partnerships with Amkor Technology for advanced packaging lines and with Linde plc and Air Liquide for on-site supply of ultra-high-purity industrial gases. Linde supplies nitrogen, oxygen, and argon while Air Liquide supplies hydrogen, helium and carbon dioxide.

Access to the factory is via Arizona State Route 303 to the south of the site, and via Interstate 17 to the east of the site.

TSMC Fab 21
Fabs
Phase	Process	Status	Announced	Begin of Production
1	4 nm	Operational	2020	2025
2	3 nm	Construction complete	2022	2027
3	2 nm / 1.6 nm	Under construction	2022	2029
4	TBA	Under construction	2025	2030
5	TBA	Planned	2025	2030
6	TBA	Planned	2025	2030
7	TBA	Planned	2026	TBD
8	TBA	Planned	2026	TBD
9	TBA	Planned	2026	TBD
10	TBA	Planned	2026	TBD
Advanced packaging facilities	TBA		2026	TBD
No.		Status	Announced	Begin of Production
1		Under construction	2025	TBD
2		Planned	2025	TBD

=== Phase 1: 4 nm process ===
On December 6, 2022 an opening ceremony was held for the first plant, attended by US President Joe Biden along with Morris Chang (TSMC), Tim Cook (Apple Inc.), Jensen Huang (Nvidia), and Sanjay Mehrotra (Micron Technology). Phase 1 began production with a 4 nm process in early-2025, at a rate of 10,000 wafers per month with a plan to scale up to 30,000 wafers per month.

The first and largest customer of the chips produced at this facility is Apple Inc., having received “tens of millions” of Apple silicon chips in 2025. Apple announced in February 2026 that it would purchase more than 100 million chips manufactured at TSMC Arizona in 2026. The chips are transferred to an Amkor Technology advanced packaging facility in Peoria, Arizona before being incorporated into Apple devices.

In October 2025, TSMC began production of Nvidia Blackwell GPUs at the facility.

The cost of construction was estimated at $40 billion and planned to be TSMC's largest investment outside of Taiwan. Under the CHIPS and Science Act the United States Department of Commerce gave TSMC $6.6 billion as grants plus another $5 billion as loan guarantees.

=== Phase 2: 3 nm process ===
As of 2025, construction on the second fab (3 nm process) has been completed. TSMC originally targeted production for 2028, but announced in January 2026 that volume production of 3 nm chips at the second fab would start in the second half of 2027, earlier than previously projected.

=== Phase 3: 1.6 and 2 nm process ===
The third fab (1.6 and 2 nm process) is under construction as of 2025. TSMC targets production for 2 nm for 2029.
