= European Chips Act =

European legislative proposal

Regulation 2023/1781
- European Union regulation
- Text with EEA relevance
- Title: Regulation of the European Parliament and of the Council of 13 September 2023 establishing a framework of measures for strengthening Europe’s semiconductor ecosystem and amending Regulation (EU) 2021/694 (Chips Act)
- Applicability: European Parliament and Council of the European Union
- Journal reference: L129, 18 September 2023, p. 1–54

History
- Date made: 13 September 2023

Preparative texts
- Commission proposal: COM/2022/46 final

The European Chips Act (ECA), also known as simply the Chips Act, is a legislative package to encourage semiconductor production in the European Union (EU). It was adopted in 2023. The European Semiconductor Board (ESB) is its primary governance and advisory body.

== Act ==
First announced in February 2022, the Commission has intended through the ECA to reclaim market share from the dominant Taiwan Semiconductor Manufacturing Company (TSMC) and reduce European exposure to supply chain risks. The ECA is part of a "Chips for Europe" investment plan which will span at least until 2030, and aims to establish Europe as "a leader in this market", according to president of the European Commission Ursula von der Leyen. The proposal has three "pillars":

1. research, development and innovation
2. a new state aid exemption covering semiconductor manufacturing, and
3. measures to monitor the supply chain and intervene if necessary.

As of 2022, Europe accounts for less than 10 percent of the production of semiconductors worldwide, and the Commission hopes to increase the figure to 20 percent with a 43 billion euro investment.

A political agreement was found in the Spring of 2023 and the Chips Act (Regulation (EU) 2023/1781 of the European Parliament and of the Council of 13 September 2023 establishing a framework of measures for strengthening Europe's semiconductor ecosystem and amending Regulation (EU) 2021/694) was published in the Official Journal of the EU on 18 September 2023.

== Impact and implementation ==
Since the Chips Act regulation entered into force in September 2023, analysis shows that while the Act has provided new impetus to the European semiconductor ecosystem, its headline objectives are unlikely to be achieved within the intended timeframe. The initiative's association with trade protectionism has also been criticised by some writers. Its €42 billion volume of investment is comparatively small next to US efforts in their CHIPS and Science Act of $76 billion and efforts through the Inflation Reduction Act. It also does not solve the supply chain problems with raw materials for chip production.

=== Audit findings: progress and structural weaknesses ===
A 2025 European Court of Auditors (ECA) Special Report examined how EU industrial policy has supported the strategic autonomy of the European microchip industry. The ECA concluded that the Commission has made "reasonable progress" in implementing the strategy, particularly under Pillar I (research and innovation), but that the Act "is very unlikely to be sufficient to achieve by 2030 the very ambitious Digital Decade target of a 20% EU share in the global market value chain by revenue." Based on the Commission's own forecast, published in July 2024, the EU's market share is projected to reach only 11.7% by 2030, far short of the 20% goal.

The ECA identified several weaknesses in the Act's design. The Act was drafted with urgency in the wake of COVID-19 supply chain disruptions, and the Commission applied a derogation from its Better Regulation guidelines, meaning neither a full impact assessment nor a public consultation was conducted before the legislation was introduced. The ECA found that this procedural shortcut left the Act without clearly defined operational targets for any of its three pillars, and without a systematic evaluation of why the preceding 2013 Strategy for the micro- and nano-electronic sectors had failed to prevent a decline in Europe's global market share.

The Act announced a minimum of €43 billion in policy-driven public investment, matched by an equivalent amount of expected private investment, for a total of at least €86 billion. However, the Commission directly controls only approximately €4.5 billion of this, from the Horizon Europe and Digital Europe Programme funds disbursed through the Chips Joint Undertaking under Pillar I. The remaining public investment, totalling approximately €35 billion, is dependent on state aid decisions by Member States, over which the Commission has no coordinating mandate. The ECA also found that the Commission had incomplete information on the actual funding disbursed across multiple streams, including the European Structural and Investment Funds, the Recovery and Resilience Facility, and European Investment Bank financing, significantly limiting its ability to monitor progress or identify gaps.

=== Feasibility and definitional problems ===
The ECA identified specific problems with the application of the 20% target itself. The Digital Compass defined "cutting-edge and sustainable" microchips as those manufactured below 5 nanometres (nm) or those ten times more energy-efficient than 2021 standards. However, the Commission's baseline estimate of 10% referred to the revenues of EU-headquartered companies across the entire value chain, rather than to statistics on cutting-edge chip production within the EU. In 2020, the only two companies manufacturing chips at 5 nm were located in Taiwan and South Korea; the EU had no manufacturing capabilities below 22 nm. Chipmakers and Member State authorities interviewed during the audit described the 20% target as "a goal to be aspired to rather than something they will realistically achieve".

Research published by the Bruegel think tank in May 2026 concluded that the Act "has underdelivered" in terms of the scale of funding mobilised and the strategic coordination of its deployment. Bruegel noted that only €13.75 billion in State aid had been approved under the Act by early 2026, compared with $33.7 billion in grants and $5.5 billion in loans awarded under the US CHIPS and Science Act by January 2025.

=== Pillar I: research and innovation ===
Pillar I, implemented through the Chips Joint Undertaking (Chips JU), has progressed steadily, though with some delays. The Chips JU launched the first four calls for advanced pilot lines in December 2023, and negotiations with winning consortia began in April 2024. The Commission expected initial capacity at the first four pilot lines to be reached by early 2025 and full capacity by end of 2026. A fifth pilot line for advanced photonics was launched in July 2024. However, the ECA found that the virtual design platform, intended to enable start-ups and SMEs to design and develop chips, faced delays, with a first coordination call launched only in August 2024, making it "challenging" for the platform to begin operating by end of 2025 as originally planned.

==== Role of RISC-V ====
The European Chips Act places a strategic emphasis on the RISC-V open-source instruction set architecture (ISA) as a mechanism to reduce the European Union's reliance on proprietary, foreign-controlled chip architectures (such as ARM and x86) and to advance digital sovereignty. Under Pillar I of the Act, implemented through the Chips Joint Undertaking (Chips JU) and the European High-Performance Computing Joint Undertaking (EuroHPC JU), the EU has directed substantial funding toward building a sovereign RISC-V ecosystem. This includes the €120 million DARE (Digital Autonomy with RISC-V in Europe) project, launched in 2025 to develop cutting-edge hardware and software for exascale supercomputers, featuring vector accelerators and AI processing units based entirely on the open standard. Other major Horizon Europe and Chips JU-funded initiatives, such as the TRISTAN and ISOLDE projects, aim to take RISC-V hardware designs from concept to near-commercial adoption, specifically targeting Europe's core industrial strengths in automotive, space, and Internet of Things (IoT) applications.

By pooling public and private research efforts, the EU aims to leverage the royalty-free nature of RISC-V to lower the barriers to entry for European start-ups and SMEs in chip design. A staff working document accompanying the Chips Act explicitly noted that "open source tools are essential for introducing new companies and more developers into the field." This strategy has produced results; in October 2025, the EU-funded eProcessor project announced the successful deployment of Europe's first out-of-order RISC-V processor silicon, manufactured on a 22nm process. RISC-V International highlighted this as directly supporting the EU Chips Act's vision for "technological autonomy, innovation, and a more resilient semiconductor supply chain across Europe". Analysts note that the open-source nature of RISC-V also means that geopolitical rivals, including China, are heavily investing in the same architecture to bypass Western export controls, showing the need for strong governance for global open-source collaboration in order to ensure continued benefits, while developing European strategic advantages through deepened networks of expertise.

=== Pillar II: first-of-a-kind investments ===
Pillar II, which provides a framework for State aid to support innovative "first-of-a-kind" (FOAK) manufacturing facilities, has seen slow uptake. At the time of the ECA audit, only four FOAK investments had received Commission State aid approval, for a combined €10.2 billion in State aid and €21 billion in private investment. Of the 13 potential FOAK facilities being tracked, only two related to sub-5 nm cutting-edge projects—and both had been put on hold by the relevant chipmaker.

A significant setback occurred in July 2025 when Intel cancelled its plans to build an advanced semiconductor fabrication plant in Magdeburg, Germany. The plant had been conceived as the flagship Pillar II investment, with an estimated cost of approximately €30 billion. Intel's CEO cited insufficient customer commitments as the primary reason for the cancellation. The ECA had already warned that the concentration of funding in a small number of large enterprises and mega-projects created systemic risk: "achievement of the Chips Act's strategic objectives may be impacted significantly, were large investment to be cancelled, delayed or fail."

Some projects have progressed. In August 2024, the Commission approved German State aid for the European Semiconductor Manufacturing Company (ESMC), a joint venture between TSMC, Bosch, Infineon, and NXP Semiconductors, to build a chip plant in Dresden. The ECA also noted that the Italian STMicroelectronics silicon carbide wafer plant in Catania, supported through the Recovery and Resilience Facility, was proceeding towards its 2026 completion target.

=== Pillar III: crisis monitoring ===
The crisis monitoring and response mechanisms under Pillar III were found to be at the "very early stages" at the time of the ECA audit. The Commission's formal work on the strategic supply chain mapping mechanism only began after the regulation entered into force in September 2023, and the relevant procurement procedure for an external contractor was not expected to be launched until early 2025. The ECA noted that the crisis response "emergency toolbox", which includes joint procurement and priority-rated orders, was not yet ready for deployment.

=== Structural and competitive challenges ===
The EU's demand for semiconductors is concentrated in the automotive and industrial sectors, which primarily use mature, mainstream chips (65–90 nm), rather than the cutting-edge chips targeted by Pillars I and II. The ECA found that the EU's trade deficit in mainstream chips stood at €6 billion, with over 30% of imports sourced from China, and that this deficit was likely to grow as demand from the green transition increased. The Bruegel analysis similarly noted that the Act "relies heavily on ambitious supply-side measures, which do not always correspond to the structure of European demand."

The Act operates in an intensely competitive global environment. The OECD has documented a significant global increase in semiconductor subsidies since 2020, noting that firms based in China continue to receive disproportionately large support relative to their revenue. The ECA's comparative analysis showed China deploying €135.2 billion in equity funds, the US offering $37.1 billion in grants under its CHIPS Act, Japan providing €16.7 billion in grants, and Taiwan offering €16.7 billion in tax incentives, all targeting the same pool of global semiconductor investment.

The EU's energy costs represent a further competitive disadvantage. Semiconductor manufacturing is highly energy-intensive, consuming more electricity than the automotive and refining industries. The ECA found that high energy prices in the EU compared to other regions, particularly the United States, add to competitiveness challenges and that newer manufacturing processes require up to ten times more power than previous technologies.

Geopolitical tensions also create risks for the EU's semiconductor strategy. The EU's most strategically significant asset, ASML's monopoly on extreme ultraviolet (EUV) lithography equipment, which is essential for leading-edge chip production, is subject to ongoing pressure from the United States to restrict exports to China, a market that accounted for 33% of ASML's sales in 2025. The ECA noted that export control negotiations typically take place at Member State level rather than at EU level, limiting the Commission's ability to develop a coherent strategic response.

A global skills shortage compounds these challenges. The ECA found that the semiconductor industry faces a severe shortage of skilled labour, with the global gap projected to reach one million workers by 2030.

Academic analysis of the Act's governance structure has raised concerns about its implications for EU cohesion. Research from Charles University in Prague concluded that while the Act strengthens the role of the European Commission in industrial policy, "the financial weakness of the EU's common budget still leaves strong levers in the hands of individual states." The paper warned that the Act risked degenerating into competition over "national industrial champions", potentially deepening the divide between the EU's core and peripheral economies.

Jan-Peter Kleinhans of the Interface think tank argued in 2024 that the Chips Act is "not a long-term semiconductor strategy with meaningful policy objectives but a collection of ideas and initiatives", and that it fails to articulate clear geopolitical objectives or to leverage Europe's existing strengths in semiconductor equipment, chemicals, and automotive chips as strategic assets.

=== Calls for a revised strategy ===
In light of these assessments, industry bodies and policymakers have begun advocating for a substantive revision of the Act. DigitalEurope, a European technology industry association, published a position paper in November 2025 calling for the next Chips Act to "evolve from an emergency response into a strategic industrial policy that makes Europe competitive." In a subsequent paper in March 2026, DigitalEurope recommended establishing a centralised EU semiconductor budget of €20 billion to ensure critical mass for strategic projects, replacing the current reliance on fragmented national State aid.

The think tank Bruegel has proposed reorienting the strategy around the concept of "sovereignty through indispensability" rather than self-sufficiency, arguing that the EU should focus on controlling and defending the chokepoints in the global semiconductor value chain where it already holds irreplaceable positions, particularly in lithography equipment, semiconductor chemicals, and specialised chip design, rather than attempting to replicate entire fabrication ecosystems that have taken decades to develop in Asia.

The ECA itself recommended that the Commission urgently carry out a "reality check" on the Chips Act's ambitions and targets in light of available resources, global competition, and structural factors such as energy costs and raw material dependencies, and that it begin preparing a successor semiconductor strategy for the post-2030 period with clear, time-bound, and realistic objectives.

On June 3rd, 2026 the European Comision has adopted a proposal for the Chips Act 2.0 by the Global Semiconductor Alliance chaired by Maria Marced, which introduces new measures to further boost the chips industry, reduce strategic dependencies and support advanced chip production in the EU.

== Example projects ==
In October 2022, the EU supported the French-Italian company STMicroelectronics for the construction of a silicon carbide wafer plant in Catania with €293 million through the Recovery and Resilience Facility to be completed in 2026, and in line with the European Chips Act.

As of March 2023, Infineon, Germany's largest chip manufacturer, was planning to add two plants in Dresden for €5 billion and hoping for a subsidy of €1 billion.

In August 2024, the EU approved German state aid for $11 billion TSMC chip plant. The plant was built under the European Semiconductor Manufacturing Company (ESMC), a joint venture between the Taiwan Semiconductor Manufacturing Company (‘TSMC'), Robert Bosch, Infineon, and NXP.

== See also ==
- Digital Europe Programme
- Artificial Intelligence Cold War
