= TSMC =

Taiwanese semiconductor foundry company

Taiwan Semiconductor Manufacturing Company Limited

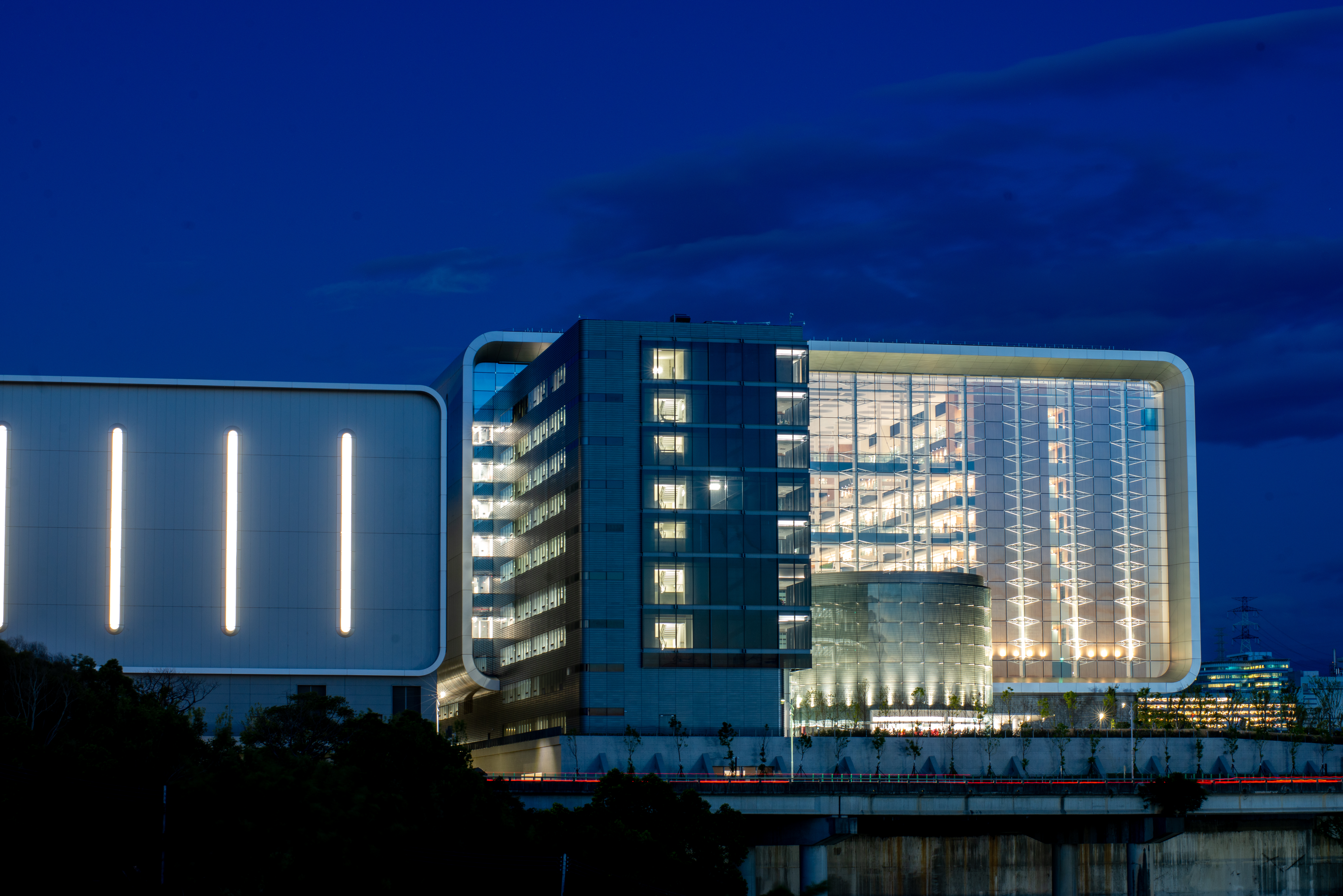
- TSMC R&D Center in Hsinchu
- Native name: 台灣積體電路製造股份有限公司（台積電）
- Type: Public
- Traded as: TWSE: 2330; NYSE: TSM; LSE: 0LCV
- ISIN: US8740391003
- Industry: Semiconductors
- Founded: 21 February 1987; 39 years ago, in Industrial Technology Research Institute, Hsinchu, Taiwan
- Founder: Morris Chang
- Headquarters: Hsinchu Science Park, Hsinchu, Taiwan
- Area served: Worldwide
- Key people: Che-Chia Wei (president, chairman and CEO)
- Production output: ▲15.02 million 12-inch equivalent wafers (2025)
- Services: Contract wafer fabrication; Photomask manufacturing; Advanced packaging and testing; Multi-project wafer (MPW) services; Design enablement and IP services
- Revenue: ▲NT$3.81 trillion (2025) (US$122.21 billion)
- Operating income: ▲NT$1.94 trillion (2025) (US$62.24 billion)
- Net income: ▲NT$1.72 trillion (2025) (US$55.12 billion)
- Total assets: ▲NT$7.93 trillion (2025) (US$254.48 billion)
- Total equity: ▲NT$5.46 trillion (2025) (US$175.21 billion)
- Number of employees: ▲91,487 (2025)
- Divisions: SSMC (38.8% joint venture with NXP)
- Subsidiaries: TSMC Washington; TSMC Nanjing Company Ltd.; JASM; ESMC

Chinese name
- Traditional Chinese: 台灣積體電路製造股份有限公司
Transcriptions
Standard Mandarin
- Hanyu Pinyin: Táiwān Jītǐ Diànlù Zhìzào Gǔfèn Yǒuxiàn Gōngsī
- Bopomofo: ㄊㄞˊ ㄨㄢ ㄐㄧ ㄊㄧˇ ㄉㄧㄢˋ ㄌㄨˋ ㄓˋ ㄗㄠˋ ㄍㄨˇ ㄈㄣˋ ㄧㄡˇ ㄒㄧㄢˋ ㄍㄨㄥ ㄙ
- Wade–Giles: T'ai^{2}-wan^{1} Chi^{1}-t'i^{3} Tien^{4}-lu^{4} Chih^{4}-tsao^{4} Ku^{3}-fen^{4} You^{3}-hsien^{4} Kung^{1}-ssŭ^{1}
Southern Min
- Hokkien POJ: Tâi-oân chek-thé tiān-lō͘ chè-chō kó͘-hūn iú-hān kong-si
- Tâi-lô: Tâi-uân tsik-thé tiān-lōo tsè-tsō kóo-hūn iú-hān kong-si

Abbreviation
- Traditional Chinese: 台積電
Transcriptions
Standard Mandarin
- Hanyu Pinyin: Tái Jī Diàn
- Wade–Giles: T'ai^{2} Chi^{1} Tien^{4}
Southern Min
- Hokkien POJ: Tâi-chek-tiān
- Tâi-lô: Tâi-tsik-tiān
- Website: tsmc.com

Taiwan Semiconductor Manufacturing Company Limited (Chinese: 台灣積體電路製造股份有限公司; Taiwan Semiconductor or TSMC, stylised in all lowercase) is a Taiwanese multinational semiconductor contract manufacturing and design company. Headquartered in Hsinchu Science Park, it was the world's largest non-US company by market capitalisation as of June 30, 2026. It holds a commanding majority in the semiconductor foundry market, accounting for approximately 70% of the global market share. As the leading dedicated contract chipmaker, it serves as the main supplier for Nvidia, Apple, Broadcom, and Qualcomm. The company has grown rapidly due to the artificial intelligence (AI) boom and its importance in the creation of advanced chips needed for AI. Its role as a supply chain bottleneck raises concerns that a disruption could cause another worldwide chip shortage.

Although the government of Taiwan is the largest individual shareholder, the majority of TSMC is owned by foreign investors. In 2026, the company was ranked 31st in the Forbes Global 2000. Taiwan's exports of integrated circuits amounted to $184 billion in 2022, nearly 25 percent of Taiwan's GDP. TSMC constitutes about 30 percent of the Taiwan Stock Exchange's main index.

TSMC was established in 1987 as a joint venture between Taiwan’s government, the Industrial Technology Research Institute (ITRI), and private investors. Morris Chang founded the company to commercialise semiconductor research originally developed at ITRI, becoming the world’s first dedicated semiconductor foundry. When Chang retired in 2018, after 31 years of TSMC leadership, Mark Liu became chairman and C. C. Wei became Chief Executive. It has been listed on the Taiwan Stock Exchange since 1993; in 1997 it became the first Taiwanese company to be listed on the New York Stock Exchange. Since 1994, TSMC has had a compound annual growth rate (CAGR) of 17.4 percent in revenue and a CAGR of 16.1 percent in earnings.

Most fabless semiconductor companies such as AMD, Apple, ARM, Broadcom, Marvell, MediaTek, Qualcomm, and Nvidia are customers of TSMC, as are emerging companies such as Allwinner Technology, HiSilicon, Spectra7, and UNISOC. Programmable logic device companies Xilinx and previously Altera also make or made use of TSMC's foundry services. Some integrated device manufacturers that have their own fabrication facilities, such as Intel, NXP, STMicroelectronics, and Texas Instruments, outsource some of their production to TSMC.

TSMC has a global capacity of about thirteen million 300 mm-equivalent wafers per year as of 2020 and produces chips for customers with process nodes from 2 microns to 3 nanometres. TSMC was the first foundry to market 7-nanometre and 5-nanometre (used by the 2020 Apple A14 and M1 SoCs, the MediaTek Dimensity 8100, and AMD Ryzen 7000 series processors) production capabilities, and the first to commercialise ASML's extreme ultraviolet (EUV) lithography technology in high volume.

== History ==
In 1986, Li Kwoh-ting, representing the Executive Yuan, invited Morris Chang to serve as the president of the Industrial Technology Research Institute (ITRI) and offered him a blank cheque to build Taiwan's chip industry. At that time, the Taiwanese government wanted to develop its semiconductor industry, but its high investment and high risk nature made it difficult to find investors. Texas Instruments and Intel turned down Chang. Only Philips was willing to sign a joint venture contract with Taiwan to put up $58 million, transfer its production technology, and license intellectual property in exchange for a 27.6 percent stake in TSMC. Alongside generous tax benefits, the Taiwanese government, through the National Development Fund, Executive Yuan, provided another 48.3 percent of the startup capital for TSMC. 20% of the capital was raised from eight private companies (ranging from Formosa Plastics Group’s 5%, CAPCO’s 5% to Taiyuan Textile’s 1%) which were owned by some of the island's wealthiest families, who owned firms that specialised in plastics, textiles, and chemicals. These wealthy Taiwanese were directly "asked" by the government to invest. The rest of the 4.1% capital came from Taiwan's then ruling party’s investment arm: Kuomintang Central Investment Co.

From the company's onset, TSMC operated primarily as a project of the Taiwanese state, as opposed to a completely private company. Its first CEO was James E. Dykes, who left after a year and Morris Chang became the CEO. Although Philips initially held a 27.5% stake in TSMC, its influence extended beyond financial investment. In addition to capital, Philips played a crucial role by transferring semiconductor manufacturing technology, intellectual property, and patents to TSMC, enabling the company to scale more rapidly. Philips also provided TSMC's first CEO, James E. Dykes, who had previously worked at Philips North America. This partnership represented an early example of the "fab-light" strategy, as Philips gradually reduced its in-house semiconductor manufacturing and relied more on external foundries like TSMC. Over the following decades, Philips steadily divested its stake in TSMC and shifted its primary focus to healthcare technology.

Since then, the company has continued to grow, albeit subject to the cycles of demand. In 2011, the company planned to increase research and development expenditures by almost 39 percent to NT$50 billion to fend off growing competition. The company also planned to expand capacity by 30 percent in 2011 to meet strong market demand. In May 2014, TSMC's board of directors approved capital appropriations of US$568 million to increase and improve manufacturing capabilities after the company forecast higher than expected demand. In August 2014, TSMC's board of directors approved additional capital appropriations of US$3.05 billion.

In 2011, it was reported that TSMC had begun trial production of the A5 SoC and A6 SoCs for Apple's iPad and iPhone devices. According to reports in May 2014, Apple sourced its A8 and A8X SoCs from TSMC. Apple then sourced the A9 SoC with both TSMC and Samsung (to increase volume for iPhone 6S launch) and the A9X exclusively with TSMC, thus resolving the issue of sourcing a chip in two different microarchitecture sizes. As of 2014, Apple was TSMC's most important customer. In October 2014, ARM and TSMC announced a new multi-year agreement for the development of ARM-based 10 nm FinFET processors.

Over the objection of the Tsai Ing-wen administration, in March 2017, TSMC invested US$3 billion in Nanjing to develop a manufacturing subsidiary there.

In 2020, TSMC became the first semiconductor company in the world to sign up for the RE100 initiative, pledging to use 100 percent renewable energy by 2050. TSMC accounts for roughly 5 percent of the energy consumption in Taiwan, even exceeding that of the capital city Taipei. This initiative was thus expected to accelerate the transformation to renewable energy in the country. For 2020, TSMC had a net income of US$17.60 billion on a consolidated revenue of US$45.51 billion, an increase of 57.5 percent and 31.4 percent respectively from the 2019 level of US$11.18 billion net income and US$34.63 billion consolidated revenue. Its market capitalisation was over $550 billion in April 2021. TSMC's revenue in the first quarter of 2020 reached US$10 billion, while its market capitalisation was US$254 billion. TSMC's market capitalisation reached a value of NT$1.9 trillion (US$63.4 billion) in December 2010. It was ranked 70th in the FT Global 500 2013 list of the world's most highly valued companies with a capitalisation of US$86.7 billion, while reaching US$110 billion in May 2014. In March 2017, TSMC's market capitalisation surpassed that of semiconductor giant Intel for the first time, hitting NT$5.14 trillion (US$168.4 billion), with Intel's at US$165.7 billion. On 27 June 2020, TSMC briefly became the world's 10th most valuable company, with a market capitalisation of US$410 billion.

To mitigate business risks in the event of war between Taiwan and the People's Republic of China, since the beginning of the 2020s, TSMC has expanded its geographic operations, opening new fabs in Japan and the United States, with further plans for expansion into Germany. In July 2020, TSMC confirmed it would halt the shipment of silicon wafers to Chinese telecommunications equipment manufacturer Huawei and its subsidiary HiSilicon by 14 September. In November 2020, officials in Phoenix, Arizona in the United States approved TSMC's plan to build a $12 billion chip plant in the city. The decision to locate a plant in the US came after the Trump administration warned about the issues concerning the world's electronics made outside of the U.S. In 2021, news reports claimed that the facility might be tripled to roughly a $35 billion investment with six factories. See TSMC § Arizona for more details.

In June 2021, following nearly a year of public controversy surrounding its COVID-19 vaccine shortage, with only about 10 percent of its 23.5 million population vaccinated; Taiwan agreed to allow TSMC and Foxconn to jointly negotiate purchasing COVID-19 vaccines on its behalf. In July 2021, BioNTech's Chinese sales agent Fosun Pharma announced that the two technology manufacturers had reached an agreement to purchase 10 million BioNTech COVID-19 vaccines from Germany. TSMC and Foxconn pledged to each buy five million doses for up to $175 million, for donation to Taiwan's vaccination programme.

Due to the 2020–2023 global semiconductor shortage, Taiwanese competitor United Microelectronics raised prices approximately 7–9 percent, and prices for TSMC's more mature processors were raised by about 20 percent. In November 2021, TSMC and Sony announced that TSMC would be establishing a new subsidiary named Japan Advanced Semiconductor Manufacturing (JASM) in Kumamoto, Japan. The subsidiary manufactures 22- and 28-nanometre processes. The initial investment was approximately $7 billion, with Sony investing approximately $500 million for a less than 20 percent stake. Construction of the fabrication plant started in 2022, with production beginning two years later in 2024.

In February 2022, TSMC, Sony Semiconductor Solutions, and Denso announced that Denso would take a more than 10 percent equity stake in JASM with a US$0.35 billion investment, amid a scarcity of chips for automobiles. TSMC will also enhance JASM's capabilities with 12/16 nanometre FinFET process technology in addition to the previously announced 22/28 nanometre process and increase monthly production capacity from 45,000 to 55,000 12-inch wafers. The total capital expenditure for JASM's Kumamoto fab is estimated to be approximately US$8.6 billion. The Japanese government wants JASM to supply essential chips to Japan's electronic device makers and auto companies as trade friction between the United States and China threatens to disrupt supply chains. The fab is expected to directly create about 1,700 high-tech professional jobs.

In July 2022, TSMC announced the company had posted a record profit in the second quarter, with net income up 76.4 percent year-over-year. The company saw steady growth in the automotive and data centre sectors with some weakness in the consumer market. Some of the capital expenditures are projected to be pushed up to 2023. In the third quarter of 2022, Berkshire Hathaway disclosed purchase of 60 million shares in TSMC, acquiring a $4.1 billion stake, making it one of its largest holdings in a technology company. However, Berkshire sold off 86.2 percent of its stake by the next quarter citing geopolitical tensions as a factor. In February 2024, TSMC shares hit a record high, with the high on the trading day reaching NT$709 and closing at NT$697 (+8%). This was influenced by the increase in the price target on chip designer Nvidia. TSMC currently manufactures 3-nanometre chips and plans to start 2-nanometre mass production in 2025. It is included in the FTSE4Good Index, being the only Asian company in the top ten.

In October 2024, TSMC informed the United States Department of Commerce about a potential breach of export controls in which one of its most advanced chips was sent to Huawei via another company with ties to the Chinese government.

In June 2025, TSMC announced the establishment of the TSMC-UTokyo Lab (TSMC-University of Tokyo Laboratory), marking its first joint research laboratory with an overseas university. In August 2025, TSMC reported that two current employees and six former employees had illegally acquired trade secrets related to the company's leading 2nm process. One of them went on to work for Tokyo Electron, a partner of Japan's semiconductor effort Rapidus, but has since been terminated. A number of suspects have been arrested by Taiwanese authorities.

In January 2026, reported a 35% increase in fourth-quarter profit. This is higher than previous estimates, hitting a fresh record as demand for artificial intelligence chips remained strong.

In April 2026, TSMC introduced its A13 process technology at its North America Technology Symposium. The company described A13 as a direct shrink of its A14 process announced in 2025, stating that it enables more compact and efficient designs to address demand for next-generation artificial intelligence, high-performance computing (HPC), and mobile applications. TSMC also stated that A13 provides 6% area savings compared with A14, while maintaining full backward compatibility with A14 designs rules, allowing customers to migrate designs to its latest nanosheet transistor technology.

In May 2026, TSMC announced plans to sell up to 152 million shares in Vanguard International Semiconductor (VIS) through block trade to institutional investors. The company stated that the sale would reduce its ownership in VIS from approximately 27.1% to about 19% on a fully diluted basis. TSMC said the transaction was intended to allow it to concentrate resources on its core business operations and added that it did not intend to sell additional VIS shares in the near future. The company also stated that the sale would not affect its strategic collaborations with VIS, including outsourcing interposer production and licensing gallium nitride (GaN) technology.

In July 2026, Reuters reported that TSMC posted a 77% year-on-year increase in second-quarter profit to a record NT$706.6 billion (US$22 billion), exceeding analysts' expectations. Reuters reported that the company raised its 2026 capital expenditure forecast to between US$60 billion and US$64 billion, compared with previous guidance of US$52billion to US$56 billion, citing continued strong demand for artificial intelligence chips. Reuters also reported that TSMC increased its forecast for full-year 2026 revenue growth to slightly more than 40% in U.S. dollar terms, up from its previous forecast of more than 30%.

=== Patent dispute with GlobalFoundries ===
On 26 August 2019, GlobalFoundries filed several patent infringement lawsuits against TSMC in the US and Germany claiming that TSMC's 7 nm, 10 nm, 12 nm, 16 nm, and 28 nm nodes infringed 16 of its patents. GlobalFoundries named twenty defendants. TSMC said that it was confident that the allegations were baseless. On 1 October 2019, TSMC filed patent infringement lawsuits against GlobalFoundries in the US, Germany and Singapore, claiming that GlobalFoundries' 12 nm, 14 nm, 22 nm, 28 nm and 40 nm nodes infringed 25 of its patents. On 29 October 2019, TSMC and GlobalFoundries announced a resolution to the dispute, agreeing to a life-of-patents cross-license for all of their existing semiconductor patents and new patents for the next 10 years. GlobalFoundries CEO Thomas Caulfield said the agreement "enables both of our companies to focus on innovation and to better serve our clients around the world".

== Corporate affairs ==
=== Senior leadership ===
- Chief Executive: C. C. Wei (since June 2018)
- Chairman: C. C. Wei (since June 2024)

==== List of former chairmen ====
1. Morris Chang (1987–2018)
2. Mark Liu (2018–2024)

==== List of former chief executives ====
1. Morris Chang (1987–2005)
2. Rick Tsai (2005–2009)
3. Morris Chang (2009–2013); second term
4. C. C. Wei and Mark Liu (2013–2018); co-CEO's

=== Business trends ===
Sales by region (2024)
Business	share
United States	68.8%
China	11.5%
Taiwan	9.3%
Japan	5.0%
EMEA	3.6%
Other	1.8%

The key trends for TSMC are (as of the financial year ending 31 December):

	Revenue (NT$ tr)	Net profit (NT$ bn)	Employees (k)
2014	0.76	263	43.5
2015	0.84	306	45.2
2016	0.94	334	46.9
2017	0.97	343	48.6
2018	1.0	351	48.7
2019	1.0	345	51.2
2020	1.3	517	56.8
2021	1.5	596	65.1
2022	2.2	1,016	73.0
2023	2.1	838	76.4
2024	2.9	1,173	83.8
2025	3.8	1,718	

TSMC and the rest of the foundry industry are exposed to the cyclical industrial dynamics of the semiconductor industry. TSMC must ensure its production capacity to meet strong customer demand during upturns; however, during downturns, it must contend with excess capacity because of weak demand and the high fixed costs associated with its manufacturing facilities. As a result, the company's financial results tend to fluctuate with a cycle time of a few years. This is more apparent in earnings than revenues because of the general trend of revenue and capacity growth. TSMC's business has generally also been seasonal, with a peak in Q3 and a low in Q1.

In 2014, TSMC was at the forefront of the foundry industry for high-performance, low-power applications, leading major smartphone chip companies, such as Qualcomm, Mediatek, and Apple, to place an increasing amount of orders. While the competitors in the foundry industry (primarily GlobalFoundries and United Microelectronics Corporation) have encountered difficulties ramping leading-edge 28 nm capacity, the leading integrated device manufacturers such as Samsung and Intel that seek to offer foundry capacity to third parties were also unable to match the requirements for advanced mobile applications.

For most of 2014, TSMC saw a continuing increase in revenues due to increased demand, primarily due to chips for smartphone applications. TSMC raised its financial guidance in March 2014 and posted 'unseasonably strong' first-quarter results. For Q2 2014, revenues came in at NT$183 billion, with 28 nm technology business growing more than 30 percent from the previous quarter. Lead times for chip orders at TSMC increased due to a tight capacity situation, putting fabless chip companies at risk of not meeting their sales expectations or shipment schedules, and in August 2014 it was reported that TSMC's production capacity for the fourth quarter of 2014 was already almost fully booked, a scenario that had not occurred for many years, which was described as being due to a ripple-effect due to TSMC landing CPU orders from Apple.

However, monthly sales for 2014 peaked in October, decreasing by 10 percent in November due to cautious inventory adjustment actions taken by some of its customers. TSMC's revenue for 2014 saw growth of 28 percent over the previous year, while TSMC forecasted that revenue for 2015 would grow by 15 to 20 percent from 2014, thanks to strong demand for its 20 nm process, new 16 nm FinFET process technology as well as continuing demand for 28 nm, and demand for less advanced chip fabrication in its 200mm fabs.

In 2019, TSMC was ranked fourth in the MEMS field, behind leader Silex Microsystems. In 2021, TSMC was ranked third in the MEMS field.

=== Ownership ===
Around 56 percent of TSMC shares are held by the general public and around 38 percent are held by institutions. The largest shareholders in early 2024 were:

- National Development Fund, Executive Yuan (6.38%)
- BlackRock (5.09%)
- Capital Research and Management Company (3.61%)
- Government of Singapore Investment Corporation (3.32%)
- Norges Bank (1.59%)
- Fidelity Investments (1.37%)
- New Labor Pension Scheme (1.28%)
- The Vanguard Group (1.26%)
- Yuanta Securities Investment (1.02%)
- JPMorgan Chase (0.83%)
- Fidelity International (0.8%)
- Baillie Gifford (0.76%)
- Fubon Life Insurance (0.75%)
- Invesco (0.63%)

== Technologies ==
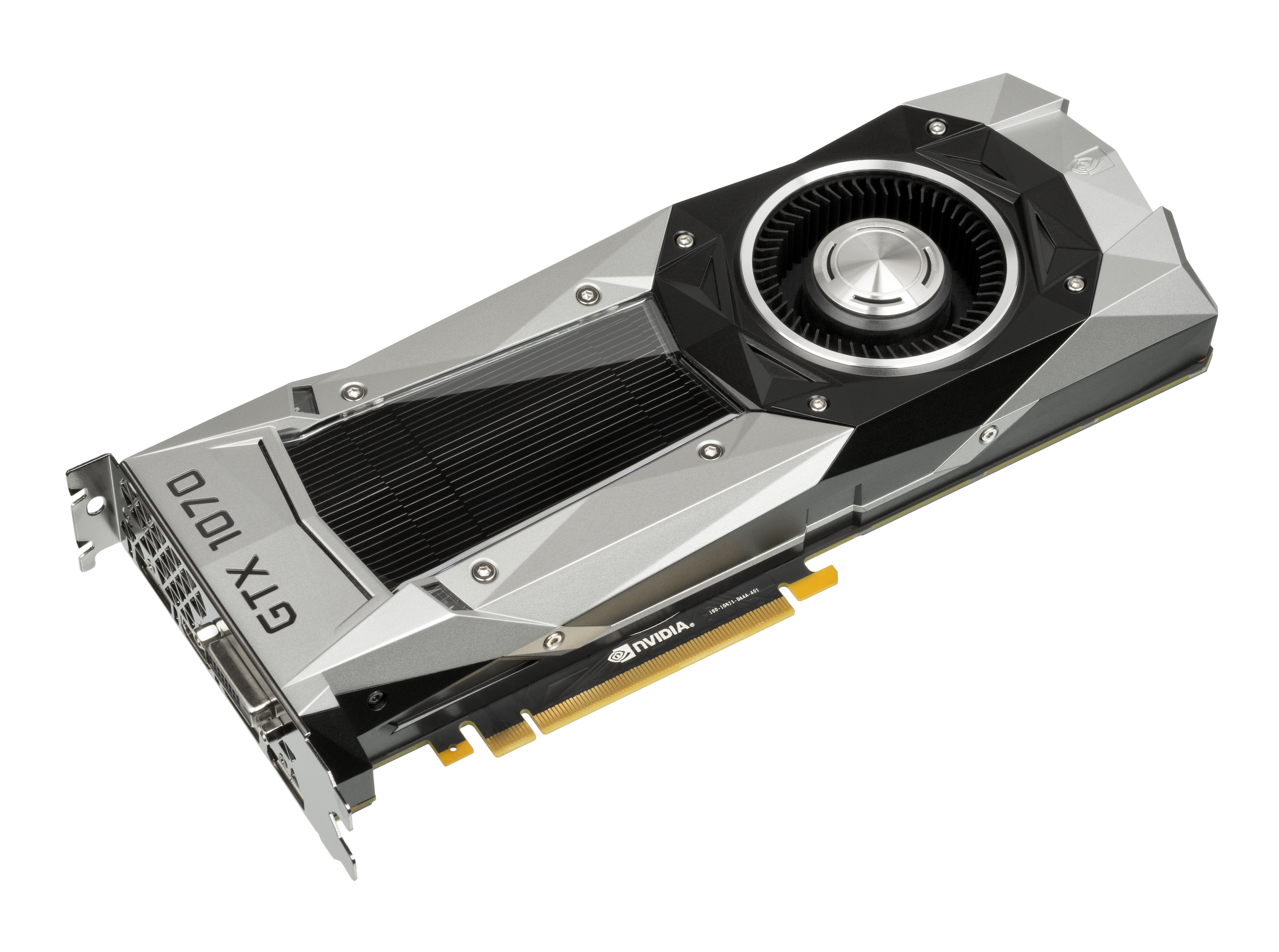
The Nvidia GeForce GTX 1070, which uses the GP104 die manufactured by TSMC on its 16 nm node

TSMC's N7+ is the first commercially available extreme-ultraviolet lithographic process in the semiconductor industry. It uses ultraviolet patterning and enables more acute circuits to be implemented on the silicon. N7+ offers a 15–20 percent higher transistor density and 10 percent reduction in power consumption than previous technology. The N7 achieved the fastest ever volume time to market, faster than 10 nm and 16 nm. The N5 iteration doubles transistor density and improves performance by an additional 15 percent.

In late 2022, TSMC began volume production of its 3 nm process (N3), which provides up to a 70% increase in logic density and a 15% speed improvement over the 5 nm generation. By late 2025, the company transitioned to its 2 nm technology (N2), marking a major architectural shift from FinFET to Gate-All-Around (GAA) nanosheet transistors. The N2 node offers a 10 to 15% performance boost or a 25 to 30% reduction in power consumption compared to the enhanced 3 nm (N3E) process, while increasing chip density by more than 15%.

== Production capabilities ==
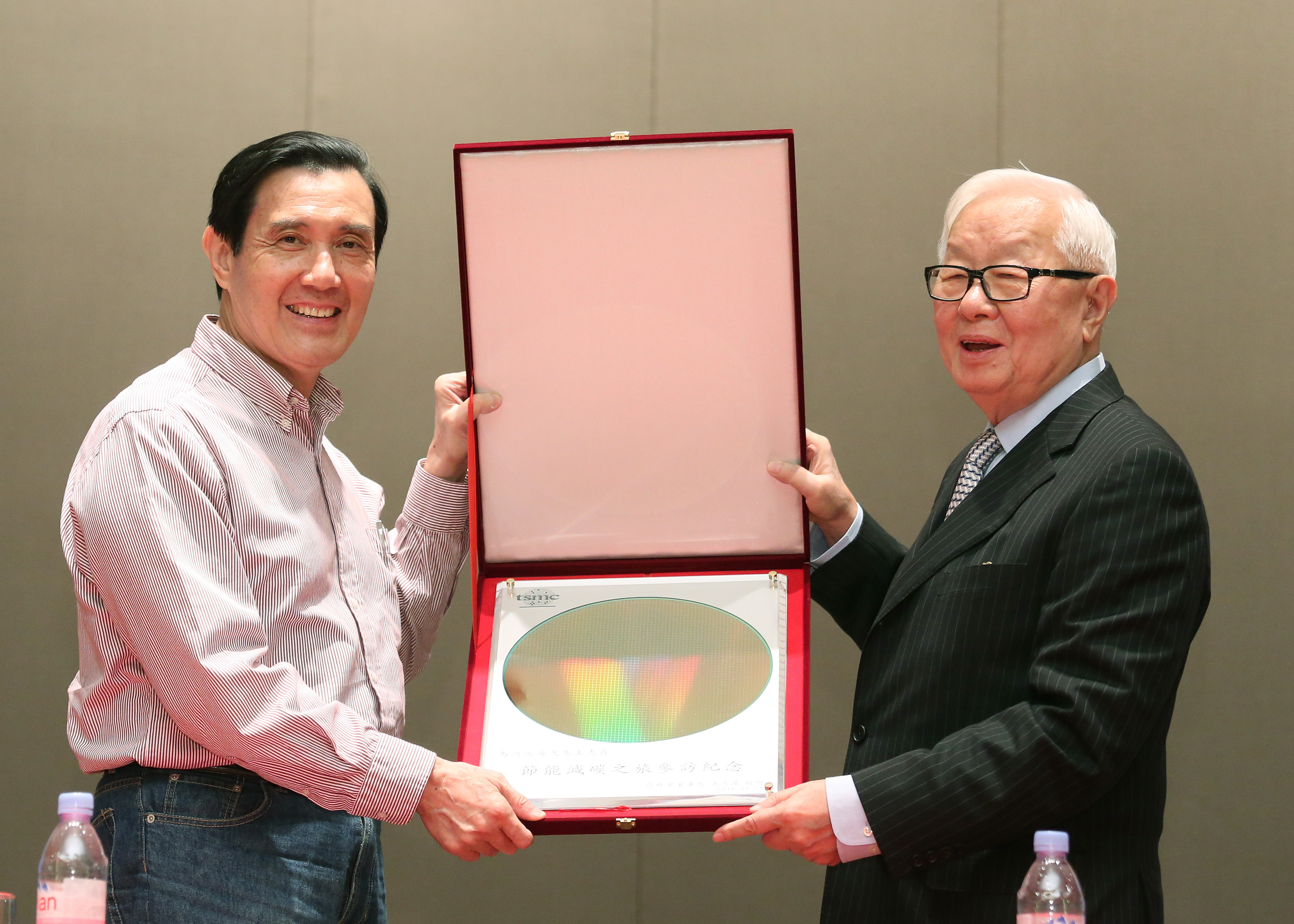
President Ma Ying-jeou with Morris Chang during his visit to Fab 15, 2015

On 300 mm wafers, TSMC has silicon lithography on node sizes:

- 0.13 μm (130 nm, options: general-purpose (G), low-power (LP), high-performance low-voltage (LV))
- 90 nm (based upon 80GC from Q4/2006)
- 65 nm (options: general-purpose (GP), low-power (LP), ultra-low power (ULP, LPG))
- 55 nm (options: general-purpose (GP), low-power (LP))
- 40 nm (options: general-purpose (GP), low-power (LP), ultra-low power (ULP))
- 28 nm (options: high-performance (HP), high-performance mobile (HPM), high-performance computing (HPC), high-performance low-power (HPL), low-power (LP), high-performance computing Plus (HPC+), ultra-low power (ULP) with HKMG)
- 22 nm (options: ultra-low power (ULP), ultra-low leakage (ULL))
- 20 nm
- 16 nm (options: FinFET (FF), FinFET Plus (FF+), FinFET Compact (FFC))
- 12 nm (options: FinFET Compact (FFC), FinFET Nvidia (FFN)), enhanced version of 16 nm process
- 10 nm (options: FinFET (FF))
- 7 nm (options: FinFET (FF), FinFET Plus (FF+), FinFET Pro (FFP), high-performance computing (HPC))
- 6 nm (options: FinFET (FF), risk production started in Q1 2020, enhanced version of 7 nm process)
- 5 nm (options: FinFET (FF))
- 4 nm (options: FinFET (FF), risk production started in 2021, enhanced version of 5 nm process)
- 3 nm (options: FinFET (FF), volume production started in Q4 2022)

It also offers "design for manufacturing" (DFM) customer services. In press publications, these processes will often be referenced, for example, for the mobile variant, simply by 7nmFinFET or even more briefly by 7FF. At the beginning of 2019, TSMC was advertising N7+, N7, and N6 as its leading edge technologies. As of June 2020, TSMC is the manufacturer selected for production of Apple's 5 nanometre ARM processors, as "the company plans to eventually transition the entire Mac lineup to its Arm-based processors, including the priciest desktop computers". In July 2021, both Apple and Intel were reported to be testing their proprietary chip designs with TSMC's 3 nm production.

== Facilities ==
TSMC Facilities
Name	Location	Category	Remarks
Fab 2	Hsinchu (24°46′25″N 120°59′55″E)	150 mm wafer	
Fab 3	Hsinchu (24°46′31″N 120°59′28″E)	200 mm wafer	
Fab 5	Hsinchu (24°46′25″N 120°59′55″E)	200 mm wafer	
Fab 6	Shanhua District (23°06′36.2″N 120°16′24.7″E)	200 mm wafer	phases 1 & 2 operational
Fab 8	Hsinchu (24°45′44″N 121°01′11″E)	200 mm wafer	
Fab 10	Songjiang, Shanghai (31°2′7.6″N 121°9′33″E)	200 mm wafer	TSMC China Company Limited
Fab 11	Camas, Washington (45°37′7.7″N 122°27′20″W)	200 mm wafer	TSMC Washington (formerly known as WaferTech)
Fab 12A	Hsinchu (24°46′24.9″N 121°0′47.2″E)	300 mm wafer	phases 1, 2, 4–7 operational, phase 8 under construction, and phase 9 planned TSMC head office
Fab 12B	Hsinchu (24°46′37″N 120°59′35″E)	300 mm wafer	TSMC R&D Center, phase 3 operational
Fab 14	Shanhua District (23°06′46.2″N 120°16′26.9″E)	300 mm wafer	phases 1–7 operational, phase 8 under construction
Fab 15	Taichung (24°12′41.3″N 120°37′2.4″E)	300 mm wafer	phases 1–7 operational
Fab 16	Nanjing, Jiangsu (31°58′33″N 118°31′59″E)	300 mm wafer	TSMC Nanjing Company Limited
Fab 18	Anding District, Tainan (23°07′05″N 120°15′45″E)	300 mm wafer	phases 1–8 operational
Fab 20	Hsinchu (24°45′51″N 121°0′10″E)	300 mm wafer	planned in 4 phases
Fab 21	Phoenix, Arizona (33°46′30″N 112°09′30″W)	300 mm wafer	phase 1 operational; phases 2 construction complete with production in 2028; phases 3-5 under construction with mass production in 2030; phases 7-10 under design with opening estimated for 2030.
Fab 22	Kaohsiung (22°42′35″N 120°18′44″E)	300 mm wafer	phases 1 operational, phase 2 under construction and phase 3-5 planned
JASM (Fab 23)	Kikuyo, Kumamoto, Japan (32°53′8″N 130°50′33″E)	300 mm wafer	Japan Advanced Semiconductor Manufacturing, Inc. joint venture founded by TSMC (70%), Sony Semiconductors Solutions (20%), and Denso (10%) phase 1 operational, phase 2 under construction
SSMC	Singapore (1°22′58″N 103°56′5.7″E)	200 mm wafer	Systems on Silicon Manufacturing Cooperation, 1998 founded as joint venture by TSMC, Philips Semiconductors (now NXP Semiconductors), and EDB Investments, Singapore. In November 2006 EDB left the joint venture and TSMC raised their stake in SSMC to 38.8%, NXP to 61.2%.
Advanced Backend Fab 1	Hsinchu (24°46′39.6″N 120°59′28.9″E)	Backend	
Advanced Backend Fab 2	Shanhua District (23°06′46.2″N 120°16′26.9″E)	Backend	AP2B and AP2C operational
Advanced Backend Fab 3	Longtan District, Taoyuan (24.883541°N 121.186478°E)	Backend	
Advanced Backend Fa 5	Taichung (24°12′52.9″N 120°37′05.1″E)	Backend	
Advanced Backend Fab 6	Zhunan (24°42′25″N 120°54′26″E)	Backend	planned in 3 phases, AP6A operational, phases B & C under construction
Advanced Backend Fab 7	Taibo City, Chiayi County (23°28′27.1″N 120°18′05.9″E)	Backend	planned in 2 phases

=== Central Taiwan Science Park ===
The investment of US$9.4 billion to build its third 300mm wafer fabrication facility in Central Taiwan Science Park (Fab 15) was originally announced in 2010. The facility was expected to manufacture over 100,000 wafers a month and generate US$5 billion per year of revenue. TSMC has continued to expand advanced 28 nm manufacturing capacity at Fab 15. On 12 January 2011, TSMC announced the acquisition of land from Powerchip Semiconductor for NT$2.9 billion (US$96 million) to build two additional 300mm fabs (Fab 12B) to cope with increasing global demand.

=== Germany ===
Logo of European joint-venture with Bosch, Infineon and NXP in Germany.

In August 2023, being Maria Marced EMEA President, TSMC committed €3.5 billion to a €10+ billion factory in Dresden, Germany. The plant is subsidised with €5 billion from the German government. Three European companies (Robert Bosch GmbH, Infineon Technologies, and NXP Semiconductors) invested in the plant in return for a 10 percent share each. The resulting joint venture with TSMC is named European Semiconductor Manufacturing Company (ESMC). The factory is planned to be fully operational in 2029 with a monthly capacity of 40,000 12-inch wafers. One wing of the building will be dedicated to 28 nm process, while the other to 12 and 16 nm FinFET - notably, the facility will not be able to use EUV process as ASML's EUV scanners are too tall for the building.

Facility broke ground in August 2024. Construction of the office buildings was finished in January 2026, at that time the main fab's foundation slab and basements were also completed, with the ongoing work on the fab itself and the auxiliary buildings. According to the ESMC President Christian Koitzsch, by June 2026 construction was on-schedule, with the plans to make the fab water-tight and install the first machine by the end of 2026, while the first office workers will move in by mid-2027.

=== Japan ===
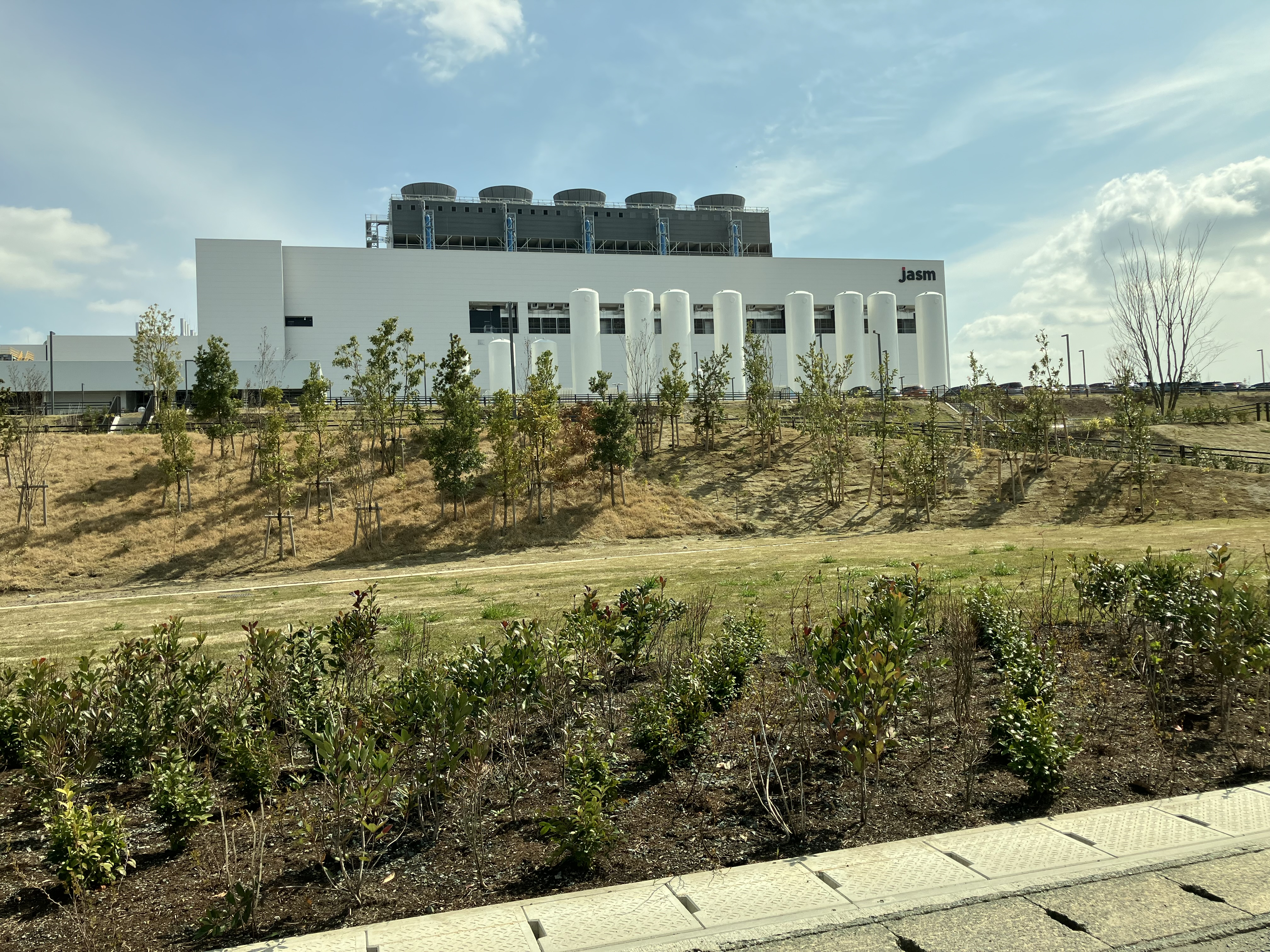
Fab 23 in March 2024

In November 2021, TSMC and Sony announced that TSMC would be establishing a new subsidiary named Japan Advanced Semiconductor Manufacturing (JASM) in Kumamoto, Japan. Denso and Toyota have also invested in the company and are minor shareholders.

The first factory (Fab 23) in Kikuyo, began commercial operations in December 2024 and produces 12-, 22-, and 28-nanometre processes. Fab 23 cost US$8.6 billion to build, with 476 billion yen subsidised by the Ministry of Economy, Trade and Industry (METI).

The second factory, currently under construction adjacent to Fab 23 as of January 2025, will produce 6-nanometre and 12-nanometre processes. This factory is estimated to cost US$13.9 billion, with 732 billion yen funded by the METI.

=== United States ===
==== Arizona ====
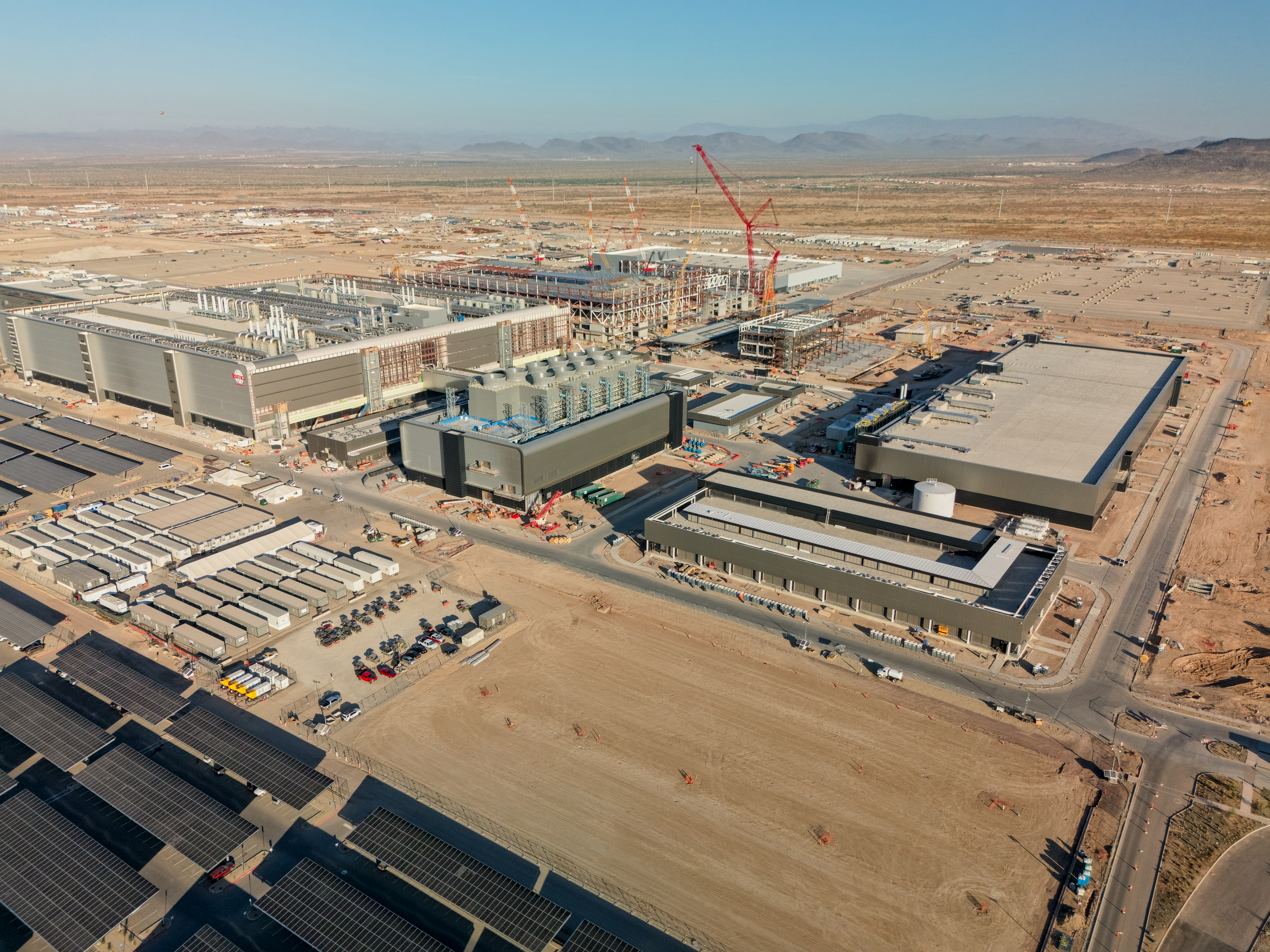
Fab 21 under construction in Phoenix, Arizona in November 2023

In 2020, TSMC announced a planned fab in Phoenix, Arizona with a $12 billion investment which intended to begin production by 2024. At launch it was the most advanced fab in the United States. TSMC claimed the plant will create 1,900 full-time jobs.

In December 2022, TSMC announced its plans to triple its investment in the Arizona plants in response to the growing tensions between the US and China and the supply chain disruption that has led to chip shortages. In that same month, TSMC stated that it was running into major cost issues, because the cost of construction of buildings and facilities in the US is four to five times what an identical plant would cost in Taiwan, as well as difficulty finding qualified personnel. These additional production costs will increase the cost of TSMC's chips made in the US to at least 50 percent more than the cost of chips made in Taiwan. In July 2023 TSMC warned that US talent was insufficient, so Taiwanese workers will need to be brought in for a limited time, and that the chip factory will not be operational until 2025. In September 2023, an analyst said the chips will still need to be sent back to Taiwan for packaging. In January 2024, TSMC chairman Liu again warned that Arizona lacked workers with the specialised skills to hire and that TSMC's second Arizona plant likely will not start volume production of advanced chips until 2027 or 2028.

In April 2024, the Biden administration announced a preliminary agreement to award TSMC Arizona up to $6.6 billion in direct funding under the CHIPS and Science Act, alongside up to $5 billion in proposed loans, to support TSMC's planned investment of more than $65 billion across three fabrication plants in Phoenix, which would represent the largest foreign direct investment in a greenfield project in US history. In November 2024, the Commerce Department finalised the binding $6.6 billion CHIPS Act award — the first major award completed under the $52.7 billion programme. TSMC also agreed to use its most advanced "A16" manufacturing technology in Arizona and committed to forgo stock buybacks for five years under an "upside sharing agreement" with the US government.

In July 2025, Wei indicated that TSMC would speed up its production timelines toward the completion of a "gigafab" cluster totalling six facilities after an additional $100 billion investment in Arizona.

In July 2026, TSMC announced an additional US$100 billion investment in its United States manufacturing operations, increasing its total planned investment in the country to US$265 billion. The company's current and planned Arizona operations were expected to comprise twelve semiconductor fabrication and advanced-packaging facilities, together with a research-and-development centre. Its first Arizona fabrication plant was operational, while the second was preparing to begin equipment installation.

==== Washington ====
TSMC Washington is a subsidiary of TSMC based in Camas, Washington, 32 km (20 mi) outside Portland, Oregon. The 105 ha (260 acres) campus contains a 9.3 ha (23 acres) complex consisting of a 12,000 m^{2} (130,000 sq ft) 200mm wafer fabrication plant. TSMC Washington (originally known as WaferTech) was established in June 1996 as a joint venture between TSMC, Altera, Analog Devices, and ISSI. The companies along with minor individual investors placed US$1.2 billion into this venture, which was at the time the single largest startup investment in the state of Washington. The facility started production in July 1998 with its first product being a 0.35 micrometre part for Altera. TSMC bought out the stake of the other partners in 2000, turning the company into a fully owned subsidiary of TSMC. As of 2024, the facility employs 1100 workers and supports node sizes of 0.35, 0.30, 0.25, 0.22, 0.18, and 0.16 micrometres, with an emphasis on embedded flash process technology.

== Sustainability ==
TSMC's operations consume a large amount of power and water and thus have significant environmental impact. TSMC pledged to have net-zero emissions by 2050 and to power all global operations with 100% renewable energy within that same timeframe. The company has also invested in water conservation technologies, including high-efficiency wastewater recycling systems capable of reclaiming over 85% of water used in fabrication processes. In 2024, TSMC reportedly consumed over 150,000 tons of water per day in Hsinchu City, approximately 10% of the city's water supply.

In July 2020, TSMC signed a 20-year deal with Ørsted to buy the entire production of two offshore wind farms under development off Taiwan's west coast. At the time of its signing, it was the world's largest corporate green energy order ever made.

== See also ==
- List of companies of Taiwan
- List of semiconductor companies by country
- List of semiconductor fabrication plants
- Moore's law
- Quantum tunnelling
- Semiconductor device fabrication
- Semiconductor industry in Taiwan
- Very Large Scale Integration
