= 1986 U.S.–Japan Semiconductor Agreement =

1986 semiconductor agreement

Arrangement Between the Government of Japan and the Government of the United States of America Concerning Trade in Semiconductor Products
- Signed: September 2, 1986
- Location: Washington, D.C.
- Expiry: July 31, 1996
- Signatories: (United States) Clayton Yeutter; (Japan) Nobuo Matsunaga
- Parties: United States; Japan
- Language: English
- Original agreement

The 1986 U.S.–Japan Semiconductor Agreement was a joint agreement signed on September 2, 1986, between the U.S. and Japan. The agreement aimed to resolve the trade war between both countries over semiconductors.

In this agreement Japan agreed to improve market access for foreign companies wanting to operate in its market and to stop the dumping of semiconductors in world markets.

According to Douglas Irwin, the agreement ranks among the most controversial trade policy actions of the 1980s.

== Background ==
While the U.S. was once the undisputed leader in microelectronics technology, it faced significant competition from Japan. Between 1978 and 1987, Japan increased its global market share in mass-manufactured semiconductors from 28% to 50% while the U.S. dropped from 55% to 44%. U.S. market share of DRAM plummeted from 70% to 20% percent between 1978 and 1986 as the Japanese share jumped from under 30% to 75% in the same period. In 1986, semiconductors accounted for 15% of the U.S. industrial output. During a worldwide recession around 1985–1986 in semiconductors, U.S. companies lost more than $1 billion, putting more than 60,000 employees out of work. The semiconductor industry's economic importance had enabled it to appeal to the Federal government of the United States for help in dealing with foreign competitors.

In the early 1980s as Japanese companies began to make inroads into the U.S. semiconductor industry, U.S. companies started appearing before the United States Department of Commerce and the United States International Trade Commission (ITC). The start of the trade war came in June 1985 when the Semiconductor Industry Association filed a complaint under Section 301 of the Trade Act of 1974 with the office of the United States Trade Representative to stop Japan's alleged discrimination against U.S. suppliers. It implied Japan's Ministry of International Trade and Industry (MITI) had imposed a sub-rosa quota on U.S. semiconductor imports and that Japan's market had strong protectionism. Shortly after, there were follow ups with allegations that the Japanese were dumping semiconductors, selling chips at less than fair market value in the global market. It is noted that Japanese companies tended have easier access to capital which allowed them to have more to spend on research and development as well as withstand larger losses during business downturns.

After back and forth actions between both countries, they reached an agreement by the middle of 1986. Japan was concerned over the risk of being shut out from the U.S. market entirely.

== Overview ==
The agreement was signed on September 2, 1986, by Clayton Yeutter, United States Trade Representative and Nobuo Matsunaga, Ambassador of Japan to the United States . The duration of the agreement was five years, ending on July 31, 1991.

The agreement had three main articles:

1. Market access
2. Prevention of Dumping
3. General Provisions

=== Market access ===
Japan was to take action to improve market access for foreign companies wanting to operate in Japan's domestic market.

In the original agreement there was no specific percentage of the Japanese market which the U.S. was guaranteed to have by 1991.

However a secret side-letter explicitly but ambiguously mentioned a goal of around 20%.

=== Prevention of Dumping ===
Japan was to take measures to stop the dumping of semiconductors products in world markets.

There were two questions to determine if dumping had occurred:

1. Whether merchandise is sold at less than fair value. This was determined by the International Trade Administration.
2. Whether merchandise is causing or threatening to cause "material injury" to a U.S. industry. This was determined by the ITC.

If these two requirements are met, a duty is imposed to offset the merchandise sales. MITI was required to monitor prices from Japan's side.

=== General Provisions ===
Provides for implementation of the agreement and further consultations. It is seen as a General Agreement on Tariffs and Trade savings clause. It also listed types of devices covered by the Arrangement and provided for new products to be added in later consultations.

== Renewal and expiry ==
The agreement was renewed in 1991 for another term of five years.

Regarding market access, the 20% market share goal from the side-letter was now explicitly stated as an expectation. However market access mechanisms had shifted to be more relaxed moving from price controls to encouraging long term industry level cooperation. Qualitative goals as well as quantitively ones were agreed upon.

Regarding dumping measures, while the goal remained, the strict monitoring provisions were either relaxed or removed altogether.

At the end of 1992, the market share goal was reached at 20.2%.

In August 1996, the agreement was not renewed again after expiry and instead was replaced entirely with a new semiconductor trade agreement signed in Vancouver, Canada.

== Impact and legacy ==
=== U.S. ===
Results of the agreement have been described as mixed. While the U.S. semiconductor did recover later on, there is not much evidence that showed the agreement played a significant role in its recovery. Instead, credit is given to U.S. companies developing better technology and design for chips.

Domestic users of semiconductors, including computer makers like Compaq objected to the agreement due to increased costs. However the arrangement still proceeded anyway.

According to The Washington Post, while the price of computer memory and therefore computers increased, Japanese companies continued to sell memory chips but at a higher price. The U.S. consumers were left footing the bill. There were no new U.S. companies selling memory chips. The agreement was seen as a public relations disaster where American companies could only compete through heavy-handed government protection.

=== Japan ===
The agreement is seen to have eroded Japanese competitiveness in the semiconductor market allowing companies in other countries to gain.

Foreign market share in Japan was less than 10% in 1986 and reached 10% in 1988. It exceeded 20% in 1992, and in 2000 exceeded 30%. The Government of Japan played a significant role encouraging semiconductor users in Japan to use foreign products more over domestic ones.

Anti-dumping measures led to Japan's DRAM market share declining from 75% in 1987 to 20% in 2001. Korea was noted to be a big beneficiary of these measures with companies like Samsung Electronics taking the lead. They were considered foreign companies yet were not subjected to anti-dumping measures and so were more affordable. Korea's DRAM market share in the same period increased from 5% to 40% and overtook Japan in 1998.

== See also ==
- Plaza Accord
- 2025–present global memory supply shortage
