= List of vaporware =

Vaporware is a product, usually software, which has been announced and is long in development, but has not yet been released nor officially cancelled. The lack of a substantial release has led these products being referred to as "vaporware". This list documents products which have been labelled as "vaporware".

== Hardware and software ==
- Ovation was a highly promoted office suite. After demonstrations that were well received, it was later revealed that the product never existed. It is "widely considered the mother of all vaporware", according to Laurie Flynn of The New York Times.
- Phantom was a console gaming system developed by Infinium Labs. A supposed prototype was demonstrated in 2004, but its release was continually delayed and was quietly put on hold in 2006 due to a lack of funds and eventually cancelled. The company was accused of a pump and dump scam. It received the first place in "Vaporwares 2004" in Wired News.
- The Intellivision Amico was a video games console announced in May 2018 by Intellivision Entertainment which was initially intended to have a release date of October 2020. Prototypes were demonstrated at road shows, but failure to secure a supply chain, stable finances, and investors have left the Amico continually delayed.
- T1 Phone was a gold-colored smartphone introduced in June 2025 by Trump Mobile, a licensed brand under The Trump Organization. Originally slated for a September 2025 launch, the release was later postponed to late 2025. Ultimately, it missed its scheduled release and did not come out even after the end of 2025.

== Video games ==
- Half-Life 2: Episode Three – The trilogy of episodes following Half-Life 2 was intended to be concluded by the end of 2007. Although while the first two episodes were released in a relatively timely fashion (in 2006 and 2007), the final installment never surfaced. It was being described as vaporware by 2010, and has since been quietly cancelled.
- Commander Keen: The Universe Is Toast! was intended to be a continuation of the Commander Keen series, with the story picking up after the events at the end of the sixth episode, but it never progressed beyond the early stages of development, due to id Software moving on to Wolfenstein 3D and then Doom. However, Tom Hall, the series' creator, has stated that he can continue it if he ever regains its intellectual property.
- A Star Fox arcade game was originally announced to accompany the release of Star Fox: Assault. However, while Assault was released in 2005, its tie-in arcade game was never mentioned again in public beyond its initial announcement.
- Stars! Supernova Genesis was feature complete in August 2000, but the developers were unable to find a publisher.
- The Grinder, a first-person shooter that was to be released on the Wii and ported to Microsoft Windows, PlayStation 3 and Xbox 360 in the fall of 2011, was announced by High Voltage Software around the time it released The Conduit and Conduit 2, two graphically advanced first-person shooters for the Wii. However, The Grinder failed to meet this scheduled due date, and High Voltage Software has remained relatively silent about what had happened to it. Years later, it was discovered that the game had been quietly abandoned, though not officially cancelled, after the developers had trouble trying to make the game appealing enough as a new intellectual property.
- Ghostwire: Link to the Paranormal, an augmented reality horror video game, was being developed by A Different Game and was due to be released in late 2010 by Majesco for the Nintendo DSi and intended to leverage its camera system. However, Majesco inexplicably backed out from the game, which was then put on indefinite hold. No further information has been given about the game's fate.
- Beyond Good and Evil 2 – Following the release of the critically acclaimed, yet commercially unsuccessful game Beyond Good and Evil, Ubisoft announced a sequel to the game in 2008 that would also be a narrative prequel to it. Rumors of the release actually happening were fed by a few trailers and concept art as well as statements made by Michel Ancel and Ubisoft. In 2016 the magazine Wired presented the game with their vaporware award. The game was re-revealed in 2017 but has largely been quiet since, with many considering the project to once again be vaporware. As of 2026, the title holds the record for the longest development period of a AAA video game at 18 years, having broke the record held by Duke Nukem Forever (2011) in 2022 (15 years).
- Star Citizen – initially announced and funded via Kickstarter in 2012, neither the game nor its spinoff Squadron 42 have been released outside a (playable) alpha as of May 2024. In May 2019 it was the largest crowdfunded project to date, having raised $288 million in backing. It has raised over $1 billion as of May 2026. It also received US$63.25 million via external investments as of March 2020.
- Deep Down – Initial teaser was shown in 2013 as a PlayStation 4 exclusive by Capcom.
- Agent – Originally announced for the PlayStation 3, the title's trademarks were abandoned in November 2018 by Take-Two Interactive.

== Surfaced vaporware ==
Products which once were considered to be vaporware which eventually surfaced after a prolonged time:

- 3G – the telecommunications technology was widely considered vaporware in the early 2000s. However, by 2007 it overtook predecessors in market share.
- Bluetooth – Initially conceived in 1994, but only gained widespread adoption in the early 2000s. As late as 2000, it made Wired magazine's yearly vaporware rankings.
- Windows Vista – Suffered several development delays under its initial code name "Longhorn", finally being released in 2006 without many of the initial features promised.
- Mac OS X – Apple's replacement to Classic Mac OS that finally shipped in 2001, replacing multiple abandoned operating system attempts, including Copland and Taligent.
- Lockitron – A device to allow a door deadbolt to be remotely controlled via Bluetooth or over the Internet. After a successful crowdfunding effort that raised over $1.5 million worth of pre-orders, Apigy experienced significant delays delivering a product in substantial numbers. Apigy eventually delivered thousands of the devices before ceasing production and introducing a new model of Lockitron.
- Spotify Lossless Audio – Spotify announced in February 2021 that high fidelity audio would be introduced to the service as the primary feature for a new subscription tier called "Spotify HiFi". However, this feature (along with the subscription tier) was put on hold indefinitely on January 10, 2022. High fidelity was ultimately introduced as a new feature called Lossless for Spotify Premium users on September 10, 2025.

=== Video games ===
- Duke Nukem Forever – Initial game development was announced in April 1997 with a scheduled launch of 1998, with a trailer of the game shown at E3 1998. It was delayed, and another promotional trailer was released with new graphics with a release date set for "When it's done in 2001". More delays forced the game to be pushed back to unknown date. The game was not heard of again until it was officially announced in late 2010, and was finally released on June 10, 2011, 15 years after initial development. The game was met with mixed reviews and was regarded as a failure.
- Daikatana – Daikatana was first announced at E3 1997, and it was shown with promotional images and software, and was planned to be released on that year, with the game already being finished. However, the tagline of the game: "John Romero's about to make you his bitch!", generated a lot of controversy, and John Romero's incredulous behavior and lavish lifestyle caused much of the original Ion Storm's team to jump ship and form Gathering of Developers. Further unrest was when the game was delayed again to switch from the original Quake engine to Quake II engine in November 1997, and the game was rescheduled for release in March 1998. It took over a year for the game to be fully switched in a new engine, and the release date was pushed back to February 1999, a deadline that was missed again. A demo was released in March 1999, which was considered to be of poor quality. The game was again shown at E3 1999, but the now outdated Quake II engine and the inability to show more than 12 frames a second (at a time when 30 frames were industry standard) caused a disaster for Ion Storm development team. Eidos, Ion Storm's parent company, which already invested $44 million in the development of Daikatana, had enough and took majority ownership of the company. The game was finally released in 2000. It is considered to be one of the worst games of the 2000s in general, and one of the worst cases of vaporware due to the hype generated by Romero.
- ZuPaPa! – a platform video game announced and previewed by Face for the Neo Geo at the 1994 AOU Show. It experienced delays and languished in development hell for six years until Face went bankrupt in 2000 and sold the prototype to SNK. SNK redeveloped the game and published it in September 2001, ironically also going bankrupt a month later.
- S.T.A.L.K.E.R.: Shadow of Chernobyl – Originally announced in 2001, the game experienced numerous delays. Beta builds of the final product have been distributed to numerous game review sites. On March 3, 2007, THQ announced that the game had gone gold and was released on March 20, 2007, though it was leaked three days earlier.
- Team Fortress 2 was announced in 1999 and took 8 years to be released. With a complete change in gameplay and art direction, the North American release took place on October 9, 2007.
- Black Mesa was announced as a full remake of Half-Life in 2004. The first release date given by the developers was 2009, but development continued until 2012, when the first fourteen chapters were released on modding website Mod DB. It was greenlit for distribution on Steam on September 11 of the same year, before being released as an early access product on May 5, 2015, with numerous features from the mod improved upon in the Steam release, and with the blessing of Valve, owners of the Half-Life franchise, to sell the product; something quite unique among fan-made remakes. The final chapters of the game were released in 2019, meaning that the project only fully exited its vaporware state a full 15 years after its initial announcement. This remake was designed so as to become a better alternative for Half-Life: Source since Source lacked new features beyond newer, revamped Source Engine. Due to its long development time (eleven years), the modification became notable for its delays, and dwindling updates on the status of its completion. The delays led to Wired awarding Black Mesa high spots on their "Vaporware Of The Year" lists in 2009 and 2010.
- Rodea the Sky Soldier was planned to be released on the Wii and Nintendo 3DS, with the Wii version ready to be released in 2011. The game remained unreleased for a few years with no significant word on its official status. Finally, in 2014, Kadokawa Games, a candidate publisher for the game, confirmed that NIS America will release the game the following year, although it would only be available on Nintendo's eighth-generation systems, the Wii U and the 3DS, as the Wii was partially discontinued and already falling into disuse around that time. Consequently, the original Wii version would not be available for individual purchase and was instead included with early shipments of the Wii U version. The game was released in Japan on April 2, 2015, then became available to the rest of the world on November 10.
- Bethesda Softworks' reboot of Doom originally began development as a sequel to Doom 3 in May 2008, but was completely restarted in 2011 and later considered vaporware. It was finally showcased at E3 2015 as a reboot, and was released on May 13, 2016.
- The Last Guardian began development in 2007, and was formally announced at E3 2009. Very little information was released after this until it was reintroduced at E3 2015; it was then released on December 6, 2016.
- Grimoire: Heralds of the Winged Exemplar was a game developed by Cleve Blakemore, a former Wizardry 7 developer, starting in the early 1990s. A 2010 Indiegogo campaign asked for $250,000, claiming a release date of May 2013, but only raised $10,598. In 2017, the game received a Steam page with a projected July 7 release date; it was eventually released on August 5 that year, after over 20 years of development.
- Shaq Fu: A Legend Reborn, a new-and-improved sequel to the infamous 1994 game Shaq Fu, was announced in 2014, the game's 20th anniversary, and was intended to be released on the PC, PlayStation 3, PlayStation 4, Wii U, Xbox 360 and Xbox One. The game was crowdfunded on Indiegogo, with backers raising over $450,000 to have the game produced by Saber Interactive. Aside from an announcement that development was nearly completed in late 2016, there was no further word about the game's developmental status or release timetable for roughly four years since its announcement and funding. In 2018, the developers confirmed that they had been busy revising A Legend Reborn to resolve unexpected licensing issues and had planned to release it in the coming months, but only on the PS4, Xbox One, PC and the new Nintendo Switch, due to the Wii U and last-generation systems becoming obsolete at this time. Eventually, they confirmed that the game would finally be released on June 5, 2018.
- Pikmin 4, a continuation of Nintendo's real-time strategy and puzzle series, was first announced in 2015 with no target platform determined. Despite claims that the game was nearly complete at that time, there was nearly no word about its release timeframe or development for several years. Eventually, a teaser trailer for the game was released proper in a Nintendo Direct on September 13, 2022, confirming that it would be released exclusively on the Nintendo Switch. Another Direct on February 8, 2023 finally announced the game's final release as July 21, and it released as scheduled to positive reviews.
- Six Days in Fallujah, a tactical shooter and video game adaptation of the Second Battle of Fallujah in November 2004, was developed by Atomic Games and was ready to be released around 2010 for Microsoft Windows, PlayStation 3 and Xbox 360. However, the game's intended publisher, Konami, refused to release the game due to the controversy surrounding it. Since then, no publisher has come forward to pick up the game, and aside from multiple assurances from Atomic Games' president that the game was not canceled, no significant word was heard about whether or when Fallujah would ever be released at all for many years until Highwire Games announced that it will finally release the game sometime in 2021 on PC and the two subsequent successors of each of its original target console platforms (PlayStation 4, PlayStation 5, Xbox One and Xbox Series X/S). Near the end of that year, after little further word on its status, the developers announced that they need more time, manpower and resources to complete the game, necessitating a one-year delay to 2022. The game failed to be released during that year and is surmised to be released the following year. That summer, the PC version was made available on early access.
- Freedom Planet 2 – First shown off in December 2015, this game was in development hell for around 7 years, getting delayed to multiple years, 2017, 2018, 2019, 2020, and 2022, finally releasing on September 13 of that year on PC. Ports to the Switch, as well as eighth-generation and ninth-generation consoles released in 2024.
- Metroid Prime 4: Beyond – Initial teaser was shown at E3 2017, but Nintendo revealed no new info on the game until January 2019, when they revealed that development had been restarted with Retro Studios at the helm. There have been no updates on the game since the January 2019 announcement except a brief mention in the E3 2021 Nintendo Direct during the announcement of Metroid Dread, where it was stated that Nintendo was "working hard" on the game. After 3 years with no updates, a gameplay trailer was shown and the full title of Metroid Prime 4: Beyond was revealed in the June 18, 2024 Nintendo Direct with a 2025 launch window.
- Captain Blood – Announced by 1C Company during E3 2004 to be Akella's attempt to adapt the novel of the same name by Rafael Sabatini. The project was restarted once when a dedicated development team was split from Akella to develop the game; Playlogic Entertainment signed on publishing rights and engaged in rights disputes with 1C Company. Despite the game being in a playable state on the Xbox 360 after being cancelled for the original Xbox, Playlogic's bankruptcy effectively cancelled the game. Akella and 1C alumni founded SNEG in 2020, who worked with other team members and Malaysia-based studio General Arcade to complete the game and release it for modern platforms in 2025.

== See also ==
- Development hell
- List of failed and overbudget custom software projects
