= Harry S. Robins =

American voice actor, screenwriter and cartoonist

- Born: Harry Scifres Robins; November 28, 1950 (age 75); Lebanon, Indiana, U.S.
- Occupations: Actor, voice actor

Harry Scifres Robins (born November 28, 1950) is an American voice actor, screenwriter and cartoonist. He is best known for his role as Isaac Kleiner in the Half-Life series and Tinker in Dota 2. Robins is also a member of the Church of the SubGenius, holding the official title of "Master of Church Secrets", and has written and drawn several comic books for them. He also voiced the narrator in Arise! The SubGenius Video and made an appearance in the 1999 documentary film Grass.

== Radio ==
He can be heard on KPFA on a show called 'Puzzling Evidence' that started back in 1982. His description of the radio show:

"Deranged “edits” segue into a cascade of echoing glossolaliac madness, the voicing of lyric ruminations from the free-falling brains of disintegrating personalities. And some people, demented individuals, obsessively record every word and squealing sound effect. Of course, you may just hate it."

== Film and television ==
Robins co-wrote the film Kamillions with director Mike B. Anderson, in addition to playing Nathan, the Wingate family patriarch and benevolent mad scientist.

He appeared on a television show, The Conspiracy Zone, for two seasons in 2002, on now-defunct TNN, in which he was the announcer and made several on-camera appearances. He also appeared as one of several underground comic experts in the documentary film, God's Cartoonist: The Comic Crusade of Jack Chick.

He voiced the trailer for the 2015 video game Plague Inc: Evolved.

== Literature and comic books ==
Robins illustrated Marc Laidlaw's 1996 novel The 37th Mandala. Robins would again collaborate with Marc Laidlaw on the Half-Life series, for which Laidlaw was the lead writer.

Robins has been a comic book artist and cartoonist, appearing in R. Crumb's Weirdo magazine and various comic books, including Legal Action Comics II and Alien Apocalypse 2006. Many of his horror comics were anthologized in Grave Yarns. He also wrote and illustrated The Meaning of Lost and Mismatched Socks published by Frog, Ltd. (a division of North Atlantic Books), which also published his book Dinosaur Alphabet. His work also appears in popular trading card sets, including Dinosaurs Attack by Topps, and Tune In For Terror from Monsterwax Trading Cards.

== The Church of the SubGenius ==
As Dr. Howland Owll, Robins contributed to The Book of the SubGenius and Revelation X: the "Bob" Apocryphon. His short story "The Smoker from the Shadows" appears in the anthology Three-Fisted Tales of "Bob". He also contributed to the SubGenius comic book, "Bob's" Favorite Comics (a rarity, of which most copies were burned in a warehouse fire). In addition, Robins' work appears in the 2006 SubGenius book, Psychlopaedia of Slack: The Bobliographon.
