= Ovation (disambiguation) =

An ovation is an ancient Roman military honor.

Ovation may also refer to:

- A standing ovation, a form of applause inspired by the Roman honor

== In business and brands ==
- Ovation (software), a "vaporware" software package from the 1980s
- Ovation Guitar Company
- Ovation Records
- Mooney Ovation, a light aircraft
- Ovation, a distributed control system made by Emerson Process Management
- Ovation, a desktop publishing software application for the Acorn Archimedes
- MS Ovation of the Seas, a cruise ship

== In media and entertainment ==
- Ovation (film)
- Ovation (Australian TV channel)
- Ovation (American TV channel)
- Ovation (award), a Russian music award
- Ovation Awards, for excellence in theatre
- The Ovation, a Thai pop band
- The Ovations, an American vocal group
