= Half-Life 2: Episode Two =

2007 video game

- Developer: Valve (Note: Nvidia Lightspeed Studios developed the Nvidia Shield version.)
- Publisher: Valve
- Writers: Marc Laidlaw; Erik Wolpaw; Chet Faliszek
- Composer: Kelly Bailey
- Series: Half-Life
- Engine: Source
- Platforms: Windows; PlayStation 3; Xbox 360; Mac OS X; Linux
- Release: October 10, 2007: Windows, Xbox 360; NA: October 10, 2007; EU: October 18, 2007; AU: October 25, 2007; PlayStation 3; AU: December 20, 2007; EU: December 14, 2007; NA: December 14, 2007; Mac OS X; WW: May 26, 2010; Linux; WW: May 10, 2013
- Genre: First-person shooter
- Mode: Single-player

Half-Life 2: Episode Two is a 2007 first-person shooter game developed and published by Valve. Following Episode One (2006), it is the second of two episodic games that continue the story of Half-Life 2 (2004). The player controls Gordon Freeman, who travels through the mountains surrounding City 17 to a resistance base with his ally Alyx Vance. Like previous Half-Life games, Episode Two combines shooting, puzzle-solving and narrative elements, and adds expansive environments and less linear sequences.

Episode Two was released on October 10, 2007, for Windows on Valve's distribution service Steam, and as a part of The Orange Box, a compilation of Valve games for Windows, Xbox 360, and PlayStation 3. The PlayStation version was produced by Electronic Arts. Episode Two received positive reviews.

Valve canceled Half-Life 2: Episode Three when they abandoned episodic development and began developing a new game engine. In 2020, after canceling several further Half-Life projects, Valve released Half-Life: Alyx.

== Gameplay ==
As with previous Half-Life games, Episode Two is played in the first person as Gordon Freeman against transhuman troops, known as the Combine, and other hostile alien creatures. Levels are linear but add a more open environment, consisting of puzzles and first-person shooter (FPS) gameplay. Sequences involving vehicles are interspersed throughout the game, breaking up moments of combat.

One of the focal points was the increased use of vehicles in open areas. However, the game retains its original linear style until the final battle. Episode Two has more puzzles than Episode One; the sequence in which the player must cross a damaged bridge was the largest physics puzzle in the series up to that point. As in the previous two games, Episode Two features numerous "achievements" (similar to PlayStation 3's Trophies and Xbox Live's Achievements) for carrying out certain tasks. Some are essential to game progress, such as helping fight off an antlion invasion, or defeating the first Hunters. Others are optional tricks or feats the player can perform, such as killing a Combine soldier with their own grenade or running down a certain number of enemies with the car.

As with previous Half-Life 2 games, one of Gordon's primary weapons is the gravity gun, which the player can use to pick up and launch props, including explosives that detonate on impact. Rather than adding new weapons, Valve explored further uses for the gravity gun in the episode, with more varied "ammunition" including logs and half-height butane tanks, which are easier to aim than full-size fuel drums.

Episode Two features a new enemy, the Hunter, which is seen briefly in a recorded message in Episode One. The Hunter is one of the most dangerous enemies and serves as means of emotional development for Alyx Vance. The Hunter is a powerful and resilient enemy which players must often run from while seeking a means to fight back; Episode Two's environments are designed with this in mind. Erik Johnson, the project lead, said that the Hunters are "big and impressive, but they can go anywhere the player can go", as the player can encounter them both indoors and outdoors. Ted Backman, a senior artist, said the Hunter can express emotions to show the player it is aggressive, hurt, or angry. Hunters are aggressive and they tend to operate in packs, but can also be found supporting other Combine troops. Later, they support Strider enemies, using their flechette guns to protect them.

Hunters primarily attack the player by bracing themselves and firing bursts from their flechette cannon. Four flechettes can vaporize an ordinary human soldier. If they do not strike a living target, the flechettes charge up for several seconds and then explode, dealing minor damage to everything nearby. Hunters may also conduct a charging attack or strike with their legs if the player gets too close. Hunters are vulnerable to all weapons, but to compensate, are still quite resilient, making explosives and the pulse rifle's charged energy ball the most attractive options. Objects thrown with the gravity gun are also effective, especially if the player catches some of their flechettes with the object before hurling it. In outdoor environments, they can be run over with a vehicle.

An in-game white-board depicting how the Magnusson Device functions

Near the end of the game, the player uses "Magnusson Devices", which designer Dario Casali described as a "sticky bomb that you fire at a Strider's underbelly that will draw power from the Strider's internal power source". The player uses the gravity gun to attach the bombs to tripodal enemy Striders; the bombs detonate when fired upon with any other of the player's weapons, instantly destroying the target. The Hunter escorts prioritize them as targets, either destroying them in the player's grasp or shooting already-attached ones off.

== Plot ==
The Combine have opened an interdimensional portal in place of the destroyed Citadel, to summon reinforcements and defeat the Resistance. Outside City 17, Gordon Freeman and Alyx Vance escape the wreckage of a train they used to flee the city. They proceed to a transmission station, where they make contact with Dr. Isaac Kleiner and Dr. Eli Vance, who have arrived at the White Forest rocket facility.

Kleiner and Eli learn that a copied Combine transmission Alyx is carrying may be able to close the portal. Gordon and Alyx reach an abandoned mine, where Alyx is critically wounded by a Combine Hunter. A vortigaunt leads them to an underground outpost, where Gordon is instructed to help gather larvae from an antlion colony to heal Alyx. After the larvae are gathered, vortigaunts begin to heal Alyx. With their abilities diverted, the G-Man can now connect to Gordon. He reveals that he rescued Alyx from Black Mesa during the Resonance Cascade, and that it is imperative she reaches White Forest. The G-Man instructs an unconscious Alyx to tell Eli to "prepare for unforeseen consequences".

After Alyx recovers, they reunite with Eli, Kleiner and her pet robot, Dog, at White Forest and are introduced to Dr. Arne Magnusson. The scientists are preparing a rocket which they plan to use with the code to reverse the portal. After Gordon subdues a Combine attack on the facility, Alyx gives Kleiner a message recorded by Judith Mossman, which contains the location of the Borealis, a vanished Aperture Science research vessel. Kleiner believes the vessel contains technology capable of combating the Combine, but Eli argues the vessel should be destroyed. They agree that Alyx and Gordon should travel to the ship and locate Mossman. Alyx unconsciously delivers the G-Man's message to her father, troubling him. Gordon learns from Eli that the G-Man provided the test sample which caused the Black Mesa Incident, warning Eli with the same message as Gordon entered the test chamber. He promises to explain more after the portal is closed.

While the scientists prepare the launch, the Combine attack White Forest again. Gordon defeats them using explosive weaponry created by Magnusson. The scientists launch the rocket and close the portal, trapping all remaining Combine forces on Earth. As Alyx and Freeman prepare to leave for the Borealis, Eli warns Gordon about the ship's "cargo". The trio head to a hangar to board a helicopter, but two Combine Advisors appear and restrain them. Eli is killed by an Advisor before Dog can chase the Advisors away. Alyx, sobbing, clutches her father's body.

== Development ==
Episode Two was the second in a planned trilogy of shorter episodic games that would continue the story of Half-Life 2 (2004). It was developed simultaneously with Episode One (2006) by a team led by David Speyrer. This schedule of simultaneous development aided them in streamlining the story between the two games to create an immersive story. The technology used was the same for both games, allowing the development teams to quickly fix any technical problems that might arise from either game; this happened often because of the multi-platform release. The team originally planned the ending to feature a comical sequence with Lamarr, Kleiner's pet headcrab, floating in space outside the rocket Gordon launches into space; however, Valve president Gabe Newell requested killing off a major character to create a cliffhanger for Episode Three.

On July 13, 2006, Valve announced that Episode Two would be released on Xbox 360 and PlayStation 3 in addition to Windows. Valve handled the development for the PC and Xbox 360, while Electronic Arts (EA) worked on the PlayStation 3 version. It was announced on September 7, 2007, that the PlayStation 3 version would be delayed because the EA studio behind the game was in the United Kingdom, away from Valve's development team, and therefore lagged behind in its schedule. According to Valve's marketing director, Doug Lombardi, the Xbox 360, PlayStation 3 and Windows versions would be identical in functionality and performance. An audio commentary is also featured, as in Episode One and Lost Coast. Tony Todd replaced Louis Gossett Jr. as the voice of the Vortigaunts.

== Reception ==
Reception

Aggregate scores
Aggregator	Score
GameRankings	90.68%
Metacritic	90/100

Review scores
Publication	Score
1Up.com	A+
Computer and Video Games	9/10
Eurogamer	9/10
GameSpy	4/5
IGN	9.4/10
PC Gamer (UK)	93%
New York Times	86%

Half-Life 2: Episode Two received an average score of 90.68% based on 22 reviews on the review aggregator GameRankings. On Metacritic, it has an average score of 90 out of 100 based on 21 reviews, indicating "universal acclaim". As part of The Orange Box compilation, Episode Two shared with Portal and Team Fortress 2 in winning "Computer Game of the Year" at the 11th Annual Interactive Achievement Awards.

Dan Adams of IGN rated the game 9.4 out of 10 and praised its improved visuals and expansive environments, but cited the short six-hour length as a drawback. He said: "Any way you look at it, Episode Two stands out, even among the Half-Life series, as something special ... a burly experience packed into roughly six hours or so that offers up all the diversity, level design, and thoughtful gameplay we've known while making sure to propel the story forward and leave us wanting more." Bit-tech awarded the game a ten out of ten score, citing approval of how the story turns and the introduction of side stories and new characters. 1UP.com said that it was "vivid, emotionally engaging, and virtually unsurpassed". PC Gamer UK felt that Episode Two was "the most sumptuous chapter of the Half-Life saga, and by a country mile". The New York Times enjoyed the gameplay, saying that battles "often require as much ingenuity as they do fast reflexes".

Computer and Video Games said that, although the Source engine was dated, the "wonderful art design and the odd bit of technical spit-shine ensure that Episode Two [...] doesn't lose any of its wow factor". They also noticed that the game "goes about fixing a lot of the niggling complaints we had about Episode One," applauding the open forests and rocky hills. The New York Times wrote that "while it sows a few seeds for the final episode of the trilogy, the game lacks the driving force of the previous episode". GameSpy felt that it was less consistent than its predecessors, and that the opening segments were "arguably the weakest".

== Legacy ==
Half-Life 2: Episode Three was scheduled for release by Christmas 2007. It was canceled after Valve abandoned episodic development and began developing a new game engine, Source 2. After canceling several further Half-Life games, Valve released Half-Life: Alyx in 2020. In November 2024, Valve delisted Episode One and Two from the Steam Store and incorporated them into Half-Life 2.

In reference to the Episode Two achievement "Little Rocket Man", which requires the player to carry a garden gnome from the start to the end of the game and place it into a rocket before it launches into orbit, Newell partnered with Wētā Workshop and Rocket Lab to create and launch a garden gnome on their "Return To Sender" space mission. The mission launched on November 20, 2020, from Mahia Launch Complex, New Zealand, as a mass simulator.
