= Dad's Nuke =

Novel by Marc Laidlaw

- Author: Marc Laidlaw
- Cover artist: Loretta Trezzo
- Language: English
- Genre: Science fiction Dark comedy
- Publisher: Donald I. Fine
- Publication date: 1986-02
- Publication place: United States
- Media type: Print (paperback and hardcover)
- Pages: 255 (hardcover)
- ISBN: 0-917657-52-7

Dad's Nuke is a science fiction dark comedy novel by American writer Marc Laidlaw. It is a parody of middle class suburban life and tells the tale of a nuclear family in the post-nuclear (holocaust) age. The story consists of a series of episodes demonstrating the ridiculousness of the family's sheltered, conformist lives and culminates in the collapse from within of the suburban community. The title refers to a nuclear reactor that the father installs in the family's basement, as part of a feud with his next door neighbor.

Kirkus Reviews dismissed the book as "sometimes diverting but more often depressing." Publishers Weekly called it "an inventive and energetic satire, reminiscent of the work of Philip K. Dick."
