= Kathleen Beeler =

American cinematographer

- Born: United States
- Occupation: Cinematographer

Kathleen Beeler is an American cinematographer, best known for her work with Trinh T. Minh-ha and Lynn Hershman Leeson. She got her start working with Mike B. Anderson on Alone in the T-Shirt Zone, which she co-wrote, produced, was production designer, and acted in. She also shot Anderson's Kamillions and has done special effects photography for numerous higher-profile films. Beeler, along with Trinh T. Minh-ha, won the Excellence in Cinematography Award at the 1992 Sundance Film Festival for her work on the documentary Shoot for the Contents.

== Filmography ==
- Star Worms II: Attack of the Pleasure Pods (1985) (cinematographer)
- Alone in the T-Shirt Zone (1986) (cinematographer)
- Morgan's Cake (1988) (cinematographer)
- Kamillions (1989) (cinematographer)
- Surname Viet Given Name Nam (1989) (cinematographer)
- Shoot for the Contents (1992) (cinematographer)
- Virtual Love (1993) (cinematographer)
- The Hanged Man (1993) (cinematographer)
- Seduction of a Cyborg (1994) (cinematographer)
- Double Cross Click Click (1995) (cinematographer)
- A Tale of Love (1995) (cinematographer)
- Conceiving Ada (1997) (second unit camera operator)
