= The 37th Mandala =

1996 horror novel by Marc Laidlaw

- First edition cover
- Author: Marc Laidlaw
- Genre: Horror
- Publisher: St. Martin's Press
- Publication date: February 12, 1996
- ISBN: 0-312-13021-X

The 37th Mandala is a 1996 horror novel by American writer Marc Laidlaw. The story centres on cynical New Age writer Derek Crowe, who uses an ancient mystical text containing a series of Mandalas as the basis for his latest work, The Mandala Rites. Crowe privately believes that the subjects he writes about are superstitious nonsense but soon realises his new book will unleash a lurking interdimensional horror endangering both his witless fans and the world.

== Reception ==
Horror writer Stephen King described the book as "genuinely creepy", while Ramsey Campbell praised it as "a masterpiece of the kind of visionary horror we've hardly seen since Lovecraft died."

Kirkus Reviews gave an extremely positive review, stating that the work was "far more fine-grained than Heinlein's (The Puppet Masters) and nearly as compelling as Lovecraft's". On the other hand, Publishers Weekly was more mixed in its appraisal, describing it as "a superior tale of human beings in thrall to occult forces, but one whose reach exceeds its grasp."

The 37th Mandala earned Laidlaw the 1996 International Horror Guild Award for "Best Novel". It was also nominated for World Fantasy Award for Best Novel in 1997.

== In popular culture ==
In the Valve computer game Half-Life, on which Laidlaw served as lead writer, this book is one of two seen on a shelf in the personal locker of the game's protagonist Gordon Freeman, with the other being Laidlaw's 1994 novel The Orchid Eater. Another locker in the room is also marked with the name "Laidlaw". Harry S. Robins, known for voicing Dr Kleiner in the Half-Life series, worked with Laidlaw on the illustrations within the book.
