= Development of Duke Nukem Forever =

The video game Duke Nukem Forever spent more than 14 years in development, from 1997 to 2011. It is a first-person shooter for Windows, PlayStation 3 and Xbox 360, developed by 3D Realms, Triptych Games, Gearbox Software and Piranha Games. It is the sequel to the 1996 game Duke Nukem 3D, as part of the long-running Duke Nukem video game series. Intended to be groundbreaking, it became an infamous example of vaporware due to its severely protracted development schedule. Director George Broussard, one of the creators of the original Duke Nukem game, announced the development in 1997, and promotional information for the game was released from 1997 until its release in 2011.

After repeatedly announcing and deferring release dates, 3D Realms announced in 2001 that Duke Nukem Forever would be released "when it's done". In 2009, 3D Realms was downsized, resulting in the loss of the game's development team. Statements indicated that the project was due to "go gold" soon with pictures of final development. Take-Two Interactive, which owns the Duke Nukem Forever publishing rights, filed a lawsuit in 2009 against 3D Realms over their "failure to finish development". 3D Realms responded that Take-Two's legal interest was limited to their publishing right. The case was settled with prejudice and details undisclosed in 2010.

On September 3, 2010, 14 years after the start of development, Duke Nukem Forever was announced by 2K Games to be in development at Gearbox Software, with an expected release date of 2011. Duke Nukem Forever was released on June 10, 2011, to mostly negative reviews. It still holds the Guinness world record for the longest development for a video game, despite this period being exceeded by other games since.

== Background ==
Scott Miller was a lifelong gamer who released his text-based video games as shareware in the 1980s. By 1988, the shareware business was a $10 to $20 million a year market, but the distribution method had never been tried for video games. Miller found that gamers were not willing to pay for something they could get for free, so he came up with the idea of offering only the opening levels of his games; players could purchase the game to receive the rest. George Broussard, whom Miller met while he was in high school, joined Miller at his company, Apogee, which published and marketed games developed by other companies. While Miller was quiet, with a head for business, Broussard was an enthusiastic "creative impresario". Apogee (from which a new brand name was made in 1994, 3D Realms) grew from a small startup to a successful corporation. Among the games they published was id Software's Commander Keen in 1990 and Wolfenstein 3D in 1992. Commander Keen was met with great success and inspired the development of many sidescrollers for the DOS platform, including many developed by Apogee and using the same engine that powered the Keen games, and Wolfenstein was highly successful, popularizing 3D gaming and establishing the first-person shooter (FPS) genre.

In 1994, Broussard began working on 3D Realms' own first-person shooter. Rather than the faceless marine of other games, players controlled Duke Nukem, the protagonist of two 2D platform games from Apogee, Duke Nukem (1991) and Duke Nukem II (1992). Broussard described Duke as a combination of the film stars John Wayne, Clint Eastwood and Arnold Schwarzenegger. After a year and a half of work, Duke Nukem 3D was released in January 1996. Aspects that appealed to players were environmental interaction and adult content, including blood and strippers.

In the mid-1990s, 3D Realms began developing a new 2D Duke Nukem game. It featured pre-rendered graphics, achieved by rendering Duke Nukem 3D graphics as sprites, creating a style similar to the 1994 game Donkey Kong Country. According to the developer Aaron Hurd, Duke would fall in love with a Russian soldier named Eva; as this was the fourth Duke Nukem game, the developers chose the title Duke Nukem 4 Eva, which became Duke Nukem Forever. This game was canceled due to the rising popularity of 3D games and the title was used for the next 3D Duke Nukem project.

== Development ==
=== 1997–1998: Quake II engine ===
3D Realms announced Duke Nukem Forever on April 27, 1997. Barely a year after the release of Duke Nukem 3D, its graphics and its game engine, the Build engine, were antiquated. For Forever, Broussard licensed Id Software's superior Quake II engine. The licensing cost was steep—estimates were as high as $500,000—but Broussard reasoned that it would save time used to write a new engine. Because the Quake II engine was not finished, 3D Realms began development with the Quake engine, planning to incorporate the Quake II features as they were completed. Broussard and Miller decided to fund Duke Nukem Forever using the profits from Duke Nukem 3D and other games, turning marketing and publishing rights over to GT Interactive.

In August and September, the first screenshots of Duke Nukem Forever were released in PC Gamer. As 3D Realms did not receive the Quake II engine code until November 1997, the screenshots were mockups made with the Quake engine. 3D Realms unveiled the first video footage of Duke Nukem Forever using the Quake II engine at the 1998 E3 conference, showcasing Duke fighting on a moving truck and firefights with aliens. While critics were impressed, Broussard was not happy with progress.

=== 1998–2003: Unreal Engine ===
Duke Nukem Forever in 1999, showing the game's graphics during early stages of development

Soon after E3, a programmer suggested that 3D Realms make the switch to Unreal Engine, a new engine developed by Epic Games. The Unreal Engine was more realistic than Quake II and was better suited to producing open spaces; 3D Realms had struggled to render the Nevada desert. They unanimously agreed to the change, which meant discarding much of their work, including significant changes they had made to the Quake II engine.

In June 1998, 14 months after announcing that they would use the Quake II engine, 3D Realms announced that they had switched to Unreal Engine. Broussard said that Duke Nukem Forever would not be significantly delayed and would be back to where it was at E3 within a month to six weeks. He also said that no content seen in the E3 trailer would be lost. However, according to programmer Chris Hargrove, the change amounted to a complete restart "in many aspects".

By the end of 1999, Duke Nukem Forever had missed several release dates and was largely unfinished; half of its weapons remained concepts. Broussard responded to criticisms of the development time as the price of modern game development. A significant factor contributing to the protracted development was that Broussard was continually looking to add new elements. 3D Realms employees would joke that they had to stop Broussard from seeing new games, as he would want to include portions of it in Duke Nukem Forever.

Later in 1999, Broussard decided to upgrade to a new version of Unreal Engine designed for multiplayer. Employees recalled that Broussard did not have a plan for what the game would look like. At the same time, GT Interactive was facing higher-than-expected losses and hired Bear Stearns to look into selling the company or merging it. Later that year, Infogrames Entertainment announced it was purchasing a controlling interest in GT Interactive. The publishing rights for Duke Nukem Forever passed to Gathering of Developers in early December 2000. Following the death of one of Gathering of Developers' co-founders and continuing financial problems, in 2003 their Texas offices were shut down and absorbed into the parent company, Take-Two Interactive.

To placate anxious fans, Broussard decided to create another trailer for E3 2001, the first public showing in three years. The video showed a couple of minutes of footage, including a Las Vegas setting and a demonstration of the player interacting with a vending machine to buy a sandwich. The trailer impressed viewers and Duke Nukem was the talk of the convention.IGN reported on the graphics: "Characters come to life with picturesque facial animations that are synced perfectly with speech, hair that swings as they bob their heads, eyes that follow gazes, and more. The particle effects system, meanwhile, boasts impressive explosion effects with shimmering fire, shattered glass, and blood spilt in every direction ... Add in real-time lighting effects, interactive environments, and a variation in locales unequaled in any other first-person shooter and you begin to see and understand why Duke Nukem Forever has been one of the most hotly anticipated titles over the last couple of years." Staff at 3D Realms recalled a sense of elation after the presentation, feeling they were ahead of the competition. While many staff expected Broussard to make a push for finishing the game, he still did not have a finished product in mind.

In 2022, two builds close to the one shown at E3 2001 were leaked online. Responding to the leak, Broussard said that much of what was shown at E3 was "smoke/mirrors [sic] for an E3 video [they] should have never done"; he described the leaked game as a "smattering of barely populated test levels". Miller said the E3 trailer had overrepresented what was playable in the game at that point.

=== 2003–2006: Conflict with Take-Two ===
By 2003, only 18 people at 3D Realms were working on Duke Nukem Forever. One former employee said that Broussard and Miller were still operating on a "1995 mentality", before games became large-team, big budget development affairs. Because they were financing the project themselves, the developers could also ignore pressure from their publisher; their standard reply to when Duke Nukem Forever would ship was "when it's done". In 2003, Take-Two CEO Jeffrey Lapin reported that the game would not be out that year. He said the company was writing off $5.5 million from its earnings due to Duke Nukem Forever's lengthy development. Broussard responded that "Take-Two needs to STFU ... We don't want Take-Two saying stupid-ass things in public for the sole purposes of helping their stock. It's our time and our money we are spending on the game. So either we're absolutely stupid and clueless, or we believe in what we are working on." Later that year, Lapin said 3D Realms had told him that Duke Nukem Forever was expected by the end of 2004 or the beginning of 2005.

In 2004, GameSpot reported that Duke Nukem Forever had switched to the Doom 3 engine. Many gaming news sites mailed Broussard, asking him to confirm or deny the rumor. After receiving no answer from him, they published the rumor as fact, but Broussard explicitly denied it soon after. Soon after 3D Realms replaced the game's Karma physics system with one designed by Meqon, a relatively unknown Swedish firm. Closed-doors demonstrations of the technology suggested that the physics would be superior to the critically acclaimed Half-Life 2. Rumors suggested that the game would appear at 2005 E3. While 3D Realms' previously canceled Prey was shown, Duke Nukem Forever was not. According to Miller, around this point he approached the Canadian developers Digital Extremes, known for co-developing the Unreal games, to take over development, as Duke Nukem Forever was "in deep trouble". Digital Extremes and Take-Two were willing, but the takeover was rejected by others at 3D Realms.

In January 2006, Broussard said that many of Duke Nukem Forever's elements were finished, and that the team was "basically pulling it all together and trying to make it fun". Later that year, Broussard demonstrated samples of the game, including an early level, a vehicle sequence, and a few test rooms. Among the features seen was the interactive use of an in-game computer to send actual emails. Broussard seemed contrite and affected by the long delays; while a journalist demoed the game, Broussard referenced note cards and constantly apologized for the state of the game. In filing with the US Securities and Exchange Commission, Take-Two revealed they had renegotiated the Duke Nukem Forever deal, with Take-Two receiving $4.25 million instead of $6 million on release of the game. Take-Two offered a $500,000 bonus if Duke Nukem Forever was released by 2007. However, Broussard said that 3D Realms did not care about the bonus, and would "never ship a game early".

Staff were tired of the delays. Duke Nukem Forever was the only 3D game many had ever worked on, giving them little to put on a resume, and as much of 3D Realms' payment hinged on profit-sharing after release, the continual delays meant deferred income. By August 2006, between 7 and 10 employees had left since 2005, a majority of the Duke Nukem Forever team, which by this point had shrunk to around 18 staff. While Shacknews speculated that the departures would lead to further delays, 3D Realms denied this, stating that the employees had left over a number of months and that the game was moving ahead. Creative director Raphael van Lierop, hired in 2007, played through the completed content and realized that there was more finished than he expected. Lierop told Broussard that he felt they could push the game and "blow everyone out of the water", but Broussard felt it was still two years from completion.

=== 2007–2009: Final years with 3D Realms ===
Duke Nukem Forever developers released a brief teaser video in 2007, to draw renewed attention to the stalled game.

The delays strained Broussard and Miller's relationship. By the end of 2006, Broussard appeared to have become serious about finishing the game. On January 25 and May 22, 2007, Broussard posted two Gamasutra job ads with small screenshots of Duke Nukem and an enemy. The team quickly doubled in size; among the new hires was project lead Brian Hook, who became the first person to resist Broussard's requests for changes.

On December 19, 2007, 3D Realms released the first Duke Nukem Forever trailer in more than six years. It was made by 3D Realms employees as part of holiday festivities. While Broussard refused to give a release date, he said that "you can expect more frequent media releases [and] we have considerable work behind us". While the Dallas Business Journal reported a 2008 release date, Broussard said that this was based on a misunderstanding.

In-game footage appeared in 2008 premiere episode of The Jace Hall Show. Filmed entirely on hand-held cameras but not originally expected to be publicly released, the video showed host Jason Hall playing of a level at 3D Realms' offices. The footage was shot six months prior to the episode air date; according to Broussard, it contained particle and combat effects that had since been replaced. The game did not appear at E3 2008, which Miller described as "irrelevant".

As Duke Nukem Forever neared completion, funding began to deplete. Having spent more than $20 million of their own money, Broussard and Miller asked Take-Two for $6 million to complete the game. According to Broussard and Miller, Take-Two initially agreed, but then only offered $2.5 million. Take-Two maintained that they offered $2.5 million up front and another $2.5 million on completion. Broussard rejected the counteroffer, and on May 6, 2009, suspended development.

=== 2009–2010: Layoffs and downsizing ===
3D Realms laid off the Duke Nukem Forever staff on May 8, 2009, due to lack of funding; inside sources claimed it would operate as a smaller company. Take-Two stated that they retained the publishing rights for Duke Nukem Forever, but were not funding it. Previously unreleased screenshots, concept art, pictures of models and a goodbye message from 3D Realms were posted by alleged former employees. Similar leaks followed after May 8, 2009.

In 2009, Take-Two filed a lawsuit against 3D Realms over their failure to complete Duke Nukem Forever, citing $12 million paid to Infogrames in 2000 for the publishing rights. 3D Realms argued that they had not received that money, as it was a direct agreement between Infogrames and Take-Two. The lawsuit seemed to be over a contractual breach, but not regarding the $12 million. Take-Two asked for a restraining order and a preliminary injunction to make 3D Realms keep the Duke Nukem Forever assets intact during proceedings, but the court denied the request for a temporary restraining order. In December 2009, Miller denied that development had ceased, and confirmed only that the team had been laid off. Around this time, a former 3D Realms staff member released a showreel with footage of Duke Nukem Forever. It was mistaken for a trailer, which confused the public. The video was taken down soon after.

3D Realms planned to hire an external developer to complete the game while continuing to downsize, and ended development on another game, Duke Begins. An unofficial compilation of gameplay footage was also released in December 2009. By 2010, 3D Realms and Take-Two had settled the lawsuit and dismissed it with prejudice.

=== 2010–2011: Gearbox revival and release ===
Despite the discontinuation of internal game development at 3D Realms, development did not cease entirely. Nine ex-employees, including key personnel such as Allen Blum, continued development throughout 2009 from their homes. These employees would later become Triptych Games, an independent studio housed in the same building as Gearbox, with whom they collaborated on the project. (Note: Lee, Garnett (September 10, 2010). "Talking Duke Nukem Forever With Gearbox Software's Steve Gibson". Shack News. Los Angeles CA. Archived from the original on September 20, 2012.: "Allen Blum and those guys, they're actually now in the Gearbox Software building on the tenth floor. We brought them in; they're now connected to the Gearbox infrastructure and our central team of animators and modelers and sound engineers.")

After ceasing internal game development, 3D Realms approached game developers Gearbox Software (Note: Keefer, John (January 8, 2013). "Morning Keefination". Shack News. Los Angeles CA.: "We approached them initially due to our past relationship and were able to work out a nice deal where everyone wins across the board. It's a mutually beneficial relationship, but it's not like a white knight came in and saved the day.") and asked them if they were interested in helping Triptych Games polish the near-finished PC version and port it to the consoles. (Note: Lee, Garnett (September 10, 2010). "Talking Duke Nukem Forever With Gearbox Software's Steve Gibson". Shack News. Archived from the original on September 20, 2012.: "Getting it all together, as one cohesive piece you could play front to back, fitting it within memory, all the optimizations and trying to get it on console platforms—that was the thing.") Gearbox CEO Randy Pitchford, who had worked on an expansion to Duke Nukem 3D and very briefly on Forever before he left to found Gearbox, felt that "Duke can't die" and decided that he was going to help "in Duke's time of need". He started providing funding for the game and contacted 2K Games' president to persuade his company that Gearbox and Triptych could complete the development of the game and get it released on all platforms in time. Duke Nukem Forever was originally intended to be a PC exclusive game; however, 2K and Gearbox had hired Piranha Games to port the game designed for PC to Xbox 360 and PlayStation 3 and added a multiplayer to raise sales.

The game was re-announced at the Penny Arcade Expo 2010 on September 3, 2010. It was the first time in the game's development history that gamers were able to actually try the game—according to Pitchford, "the line has gotten up to four hours long to see the game". Gearbox Software subsequently purchased the Duke Nukem intellectual property from 3D Realms, and 2K Games held the exclusive long-term publishing rights of the game.

Development was almost complete with only minor polishing to be done before the game was to be released in 2011. A playable demo of Duke Nukem Forever was released by Gearbox, with some differences from the versions available at PAX and Firstlook. Early access to the demo was granted to purchasers of the Game of the Year Edition of Borderlands, including those that purchased the standard version of Borderlands on Steam prior to October 12, 2010. Duke Nukem Forever was initially scheduled for release on May 3 in the United States and May 6 internationally. After a final delay, Gearbox announced the game had 'gone gold on May 24, 2011, bringing its development to a close after 14 years and 44 days; it was released weeks later on June 14 in North America and June 10 worldwide. Duke Nukem Forever holds the Guinness world record for the longest development for a video game, at 14 years and 44 days, though this period was exceeded in 2022 by Beyond Good and Evil 2 and in 2024 by Kien.

== Press coverage ==
Wired News awarded Duke Nukem Forever its Vaporware Award several times. It placed second in June 2000 and topped the list in 2001 and 2002. Wired created the Vaporware Lifetime Achievement Award exclusively for DNF and awarded it in 2003. Broussard accepted the award, simply stating, "We're undeniably late and we know it." In 2004, the game did not make the top 10; Wired editors said that they had given DNF the Lifetime Achievement Award to get it off of the list. However, upon readers' demands, Wired reconsidered and DNF won first place in 2005, 2006, and 2007. In 2008, Wired staff officially considered removing DNF from their annual list, citing that "even the best jokes get old eventually", only to reconsider upon viewing the handheld camera footage of the game in The Jace Hall Show, awarding the game with first place once again. In 2009, Wired published Wired News' Vaporware Awards 2009: Duke Nukem Forever was excluded from consideration on the grounds that the project was finally dead.

With the game since in development at Gearbox Software and a subsequent playable demo, Duke made a comeback with an unprecedented 11th place award on Wired's 2010 Vaporware list. When the GameSpy editors compiled a list of the "Top 25 Dumbest Moments in Gaming History" in June 2003, Duke Nukem Forever placed #18. Duke Nukem Forever has drawn a number of jokes related to its development timeline. The video gaming media and public in general have routinely suggested names in place of Forever, calling it "Never", "(Taking) Forever", "Whenever", "ForNever", "Neverever", and "If Ever". The game has also been ridiculed as Duke Nukem: Forever In Development; "Either this is the longest game ever in production or an elaborate in-joke at the expense of the industry".

== Additional references ==
- 3D Realms (April 28, 1997). "Duke does Quake – The Big Question Answered – Why?". 3D Realms. Archived from the original on October 12, 1999.
- 3D Realms (June 15, 1998). "Duke Nukem Forever Switches to Unreal Engine". 3D Realms.
- 3D Realms (December 4, 2000). "Duke Nukem Turns His Life Over to g.o.d." 3D Realms.
- Aguilar, Mario (January 20, 2010). "Storyboard: Duke Nukem Forever's Spectacular Failure". Wired.
- Fahey, Rob (September 3, 2005). "GDC: Duke Nukem Forever physics surpass Half-Life 2". GamesIndustry.biz.
- IGN Staff (October 19, 1999). "Broussard Talks Duke 4; The lead man behind DNF talks about the "complex" process of making the much-anticipated sequel". IGN.
- Kushner, David (2004). Masters of Doom: How Two Guys Created An Empire and Transformed Pop Culture. Random House. ISBN 0-8129-7215-5.
- Remo, Chris (August 30, 2006). "3D Realms Sees Major Employee Departures, Fate of DNF in Question?". Shacknews.
- Remo, Chris (December 17, 2007). "New DNF Trailer". Shacknews.
- Thorsen, Tor (June 9, 2006). "Take-Two stock tanks, Duke Nukem Forever due by Dec. 31?". GameSpot.
- Wernicke, Brad (June 16, 1998). "George Broussard (06/16/98); on the switch from Quake II to Unreal engine for Duke Nukem Forever". IGN. Planet Duke. Archived from the original on December 16, 2005.
