= Lockitron =

Device able to remotely lock and unlock doors

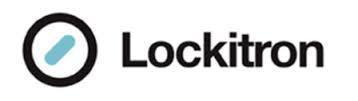

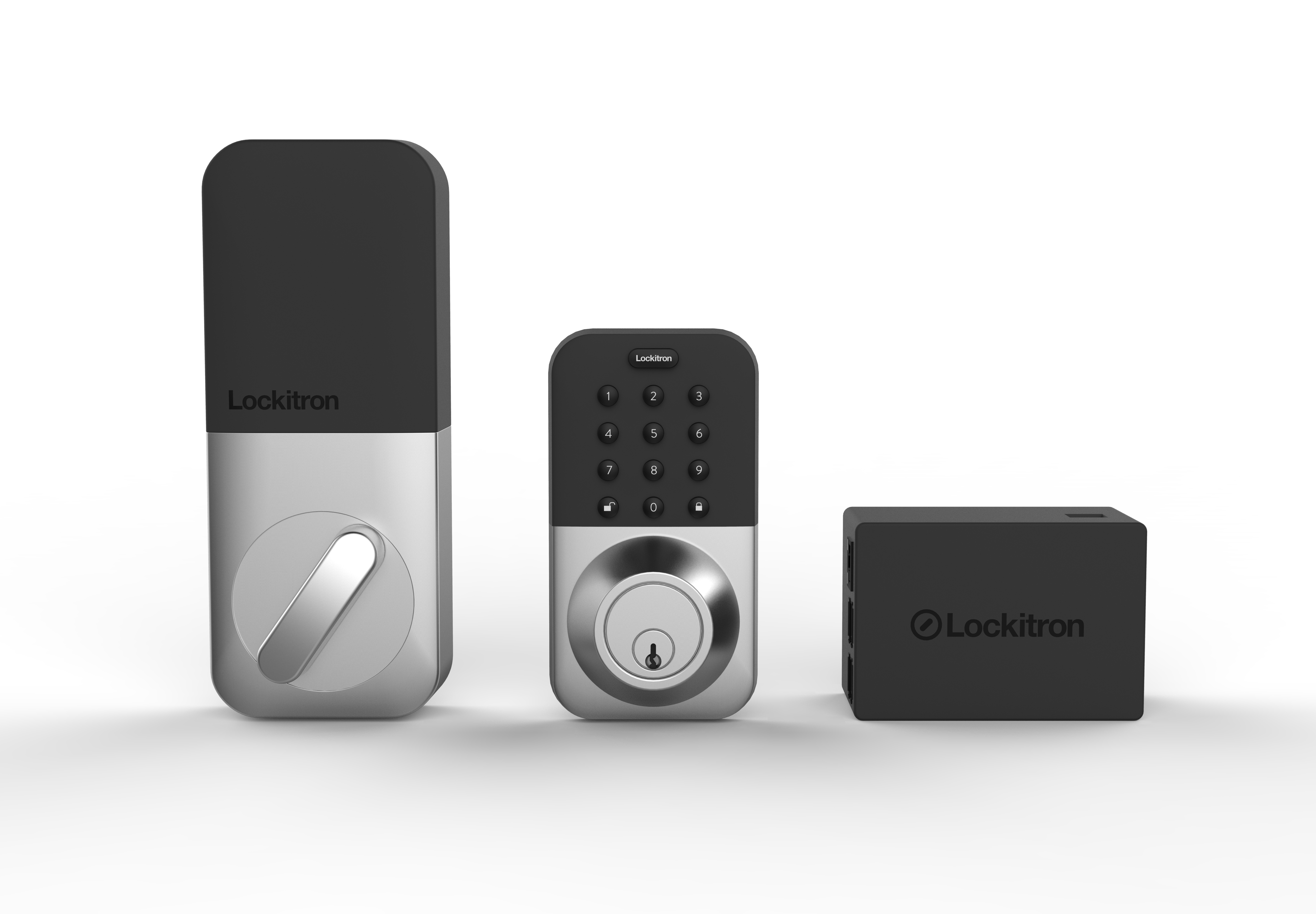
- The Lockitron Bolt smart lock, keypad, and bridge
- Also known as: Lockitron
- Manufacturer: Apigy Inc.
- Availability: May 2011
- Introductory price: 99 to 179 USD depending on model and accessories
- Discontinued: Yes
- Connectivity: WiFi; Low Energy
- Power: 4 AA batteries, lasting for 6 months
- Website: lockitron.com at the Wayback Machine (archived 2018-03-27)

Lockitron is a device which can lock and unlock doors via remote control, typically via a smartphone. Starting with installations in 2010, it is one of the earliest examples of a smart lock. Lockitron was made by Apigy Inc., a start-up based in Mountain View, California. Apigy was a graduate of the Y Combinator start-up accelerator.

Multiple models of Lockitron were manufactured, including one that fits over the lock control mechanism on the inside of a door, and the door could be unlocked via an app on the phone, or via web page control. Phones with Bluetooth Low Energy could automatically unlock a door when an authenticated device was nearby. A supplied NFC tag could be read to trigger a command to toggle the state of the lock.

Virtual "keys" could be issued to guests or repair contractors etc., allowing access to the home. The virtual keys could be distributed over the internet on demand, and can also be revoked on demand. The door could also be locked or unlocked via an SMS "key" for those without smartphones.

All models of Lockitron allowed for a traditional lock which continues to work with traditional metal keys. When a metal key was used, some models of Lockitron sent a notification to a smartphone.

Lockitron was notable for offering an open, web-accessible API. Lockitron supported integration with the Ring Video Doorbell and its predecessor DoorBot, a doorbell system that sends video and voice from the door to a smartphone. Other devices that have integrated with the Lockitron API include the Pebble Smartwatch, which allowed you to directly lock and unlock a Lockitron from your wrist, and IFTTT, which connected Lockitron to platforms and devices like Amazon Alexa, Google Home, and Nest.

== History ==
=== Early Development ===
Beginning in 2010 Apigy installed hand-built Lockitrons in a number of Bay Area startup offices in SOMAcentral including Mashable. The lock component was an off-the-shelf electronic lock paired with a SheevaPlug server via a 433mhz remote control. The server was Ethernet connected and would accept commands from a hosted web app allowing remote control from any internet connected location.

In May 2011 Apigy formally launched this first version of Lockitron, garnerning coverage from TechCrunch, The New York Times, Popular Science and other news outlets. Lockitron was featured on an episode of DIY Network's "I Want That" in early 2012. Throughout this time all Lockitrons were still assembled by founders Cameron Robertson and Paul Gerhardt. In 2012 they sought to create a mass-manufactured, easy to install model.

=== Kickstarter Rejection and Crowdfunding ===
The 2012 "crowdfunded" Lockitron promised a number of improvements over the original Lockitron deadbolt, the primary feature being that it could be installed over existing door locks. It included built-in WiFi in place of the wired mini-server and built-in auto-unlock technology through Bluetooth Low Energy. The crowdfunded Lockitron was built around an ATMega microprocessor meaning that it is Arduino compatible for other custom behavior.

In late 2012 Robertson and Gerhardt applied to Kickstarter which had recently hosted other significant crowdfunding successes like Pebble, SmartThings and LIFX. As later reported by Robertson and Gerhardt, Lockitron was rejected from Kickstarter due to the platform considering it a "home improvement" project; the rejection coincided with Kickstarter changing its policies regarding hardware funding. After their rejection, Apigy built its own crowdfunding website in a matter of days and used it to garner over US$1.5 million in preorders during the first week of their campaign in October 2012. The independent crowdfunding effort kicked off significant press as it demonstrated that projects didn't need to pay significant fees to platforms like Kickstarter in order to crowdfund.

Apigy subsequently open-sourced the crowdfunding software as Selfstarter, an alternative crowdfunding site. Selfstarter was used in the successful Tile crowdfunding campaign and later formed the basis of Crowdhoster and CrowdTilt Open.

=== Notable Office ===
From 2013 to 2016 Apigy leased the building which previously housed the Byte Shop, the store where the first Apple I computers were sold. Apigy hosted a Lockitron open house at the location where several working Apple II computers were set up for attendees to play classic games like TRON and Pacman.

=== Product Delays and Replacement ===
Despite demonstrating the crowdfunded Lockitron at the 2013 Consumer Electronics Show, the product was significantly delayed from its originally anticipated ship date of July 2013. It was considered to be vaporware until finally shipping in small numbers through the end of 2013. By February 2014, the crowdfunded Lockitron had still not yet shipped in substantial numbers prompting coverage by the blog TechCrunch. By the end of 2014 thousands of units had been shipped.

In early 2015, Apigy announced its new product, Lockitron Bolt, as a replacement for the crowdfunded Lockitron and that it had ceased production of the crowdfunded Lockitron due to manufacturing and product issues. Left with significant inventory of Lockitron parts, the company worked with hobby websites SparkFun and Adafruist to offer just the housing and gear trains for purchase.

Lockitron Bolt was priced at US$99 and offered Bluetooth-only connectivity using a Nordic nrf51822 microprocessor in comparison to its predecessor which was priced at US$179 and offered built-in WiFi. With limited funding and significant excess components, Apigy re-purposed excess inventory of Electric Imp WiFi modules and BlueGiga BLE112 modules intended for the crowdfunded Lockitron into a new accessory product called Bridge. An optional US$79 device, Bridge connected Lockitron Bolt to WiFi networks giving it the same remote capabilities as the 2012 Lockitron.

In late 2015 Apigy announced that the first Lockitron Bolt devices would ship November 24 while also announcing an add-on to Lockitron Bolt, Keypad.

=== Acquisition ===
Lockitron Bolt was exhibited as a working product at the 2016 Consumer Electronics Show, and a series of updates in late 2016 indicated that remaining Lockitron Bolt units owed to backers were produced and all remaining orders for U.S. customers had shipped to customers. In 2016 Lockitron Bolt appeared on an episode of the show All-American Makers where Robertson and Gerhardt demonstrated the product, however, they were not offered investment.

Starting in 2017 Lockitron Bolt was sold through retailers like Target, ultimately garnering a spot in The Wirecutter as the best budget smart lock later that year. Slock.it featured Lockitron Bolt during the development of their early decentralized rental platform that was intended to run on Ethereum.

The Chamberlain Group announced in early 2019 that they had acquired Lockitron in order to integrate door locks into their myQ platform. The Lockitron system was shut down on June 17, 2020. Lockitron Bolt can still be controlled on the MyQ platform, but other models are no longer supported.
