= Half-Life 2: Episode Three =

Canceled video game

- Concept art depicting the Borealis
- Developer: Valve Corporation
- Publisher: Valve Corporation
- Writer: Marc Laidlaw
- Series: Half-Life
- Engine: Source
- Release: Canceled
- Genre: First-person shooter
- Mode: Single-player

Half-Life 2: Episode Three is a canceled first-person shooter game developed by Valve. It was planned as the last in a trilogy of episodic games continuing the story of Half-Life 2 (2004). Valve announced Episode Three in May 2006, with a release planned for 2007. Following the cliffhanger ending of Episode Two (2007), it was widely anticipated.

Episode Three was to be set in the Arctic and introduce elements such as an ice gun and a blob-like enemy. Marc Laidlaw, the writer for the Half-Life series, intended it to end the Half-Life 2 story arc. Little information was released over the following years, and in 2011 Wired described it as vaporware.

Valve eventually canceled Episode Three as they had become fatigued with Half-Life and could not settle on a direction. Additionally, they wanted to create more ambitious games and felt limited by the episodic format. They delayed development of a new Half-Life game until their new game engine, Source 2, was complete.

Laidlaw left Valve in 2016. In 2017, he released a short story that journalists speculated was a summary of the Episode Three plot. In response, fans launched projects attempting to recreate Episode Three. After canceling several further Half-Life games, Valve released a virtual reality game, Half-Life: Alyx, in 2020.

== Premise ==
Like previous Half-Life games, Half-Life 2: Episode Three was a first-person shooter (FPS). It was to be the last in a trilogy of episodic games that would continue the story of the 2004 game Half-Life 2. Episode One was released in 2006, followed by Episode Two in 2007. Valve's president, Gabe Newell, said he considered the trilogy the equivalent of Half-Life 3.

Episode Three was set in the Arctic and focused on the missing Borealis ship mentioned in Episode Two and another Valve game, Portal 2. It featured a weapon that created barriers and ramps from ice, and a blob-like enemy that could divide itself, consume other enemies and pass through grates. Leaks of Valve development files in 2026 included a model for a weapon used to turn objects into ammunition, and another that would create a giant "blob" that could trap or attack enemies.

In 2009, reports surfaced that Valve was working with sign language and on a deaf character. Newell said that Gordon's companion, Alyx Vance, had programmed her pet robot, Dog, to use sign language, inspired by a deaf person she had a crush on. In 2010, Newell spoke of "broadening the emotional palette" of the Half-Life series, and said the next game may return to "genuinely scaring the player".

According to Newell, whereas the original Half-Life (1998) saw the mysterious G-Man transform the protagonist, Gordon Freeman, into his tool, and Half-Life 2 saw Freeman being used by G-Man, the episodes would see G-Man lose control. Marc Laidlaw, the writer for the Half-Life series, later said he had intended Episode Three to end the Half-Life 2 story arc, at which point he would "step away from it and leave it to the next generation". He planned an ending similar to previous games, with Freeman left in "an indeterminate space, on hold ... So one cliffhanger after another ... I expected every installment would end without resolution, for ever and ever."

== Development ==
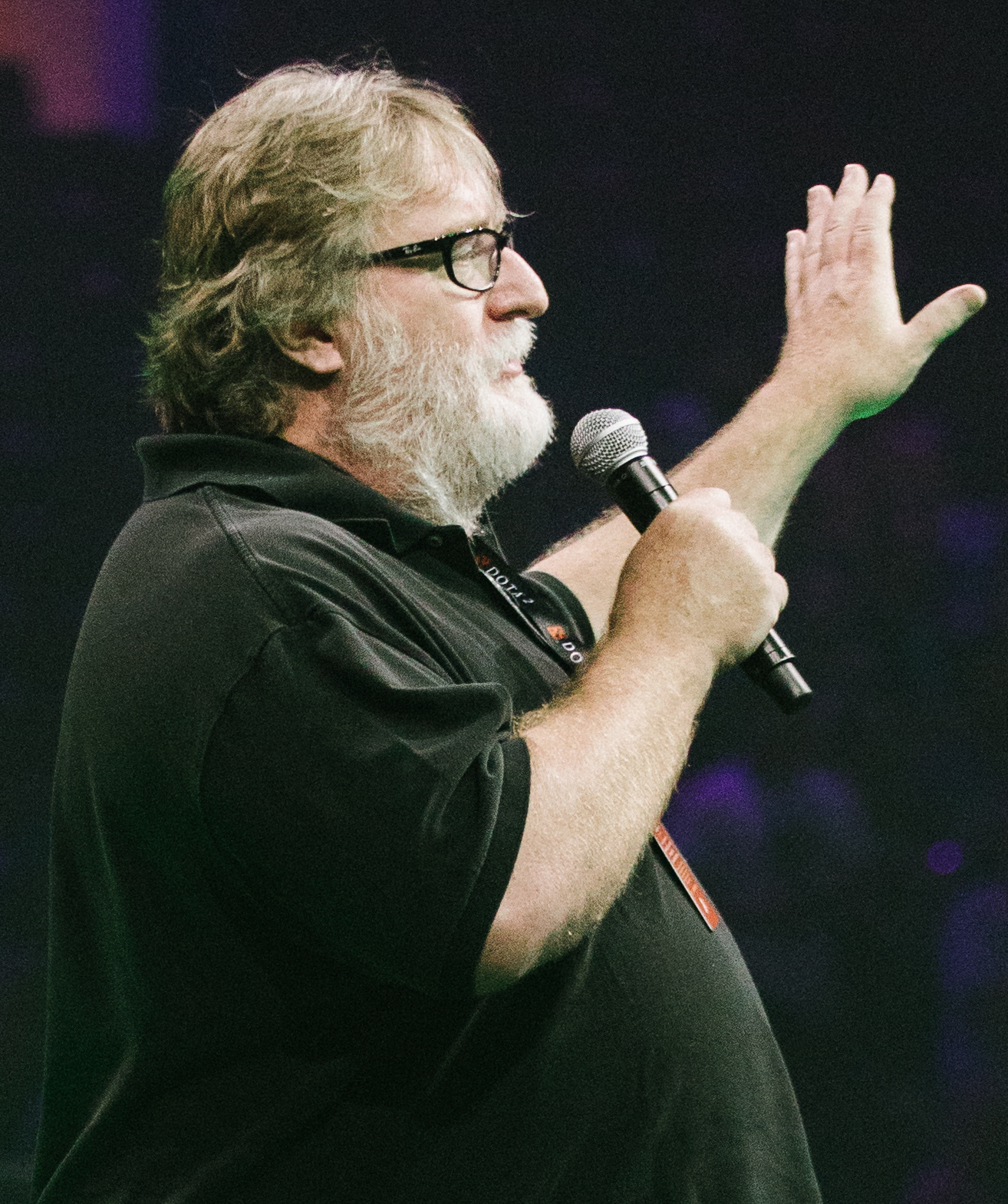
The Valve president, Gabe Newell, in 2018

Valve announced Episode Three in May 2006, planning to release it by Christmas 2007. According to the engineer David Speyrer, after six months of development, it comprised a "collection of playable levels in no particular order" and some story beats.

Working on Episode Three, Valve became fatigued with Half-Life and struggled to discover new game mechanics. Laidlaw said the French developer Arkane Studios was having the same problem while developing another canceled Half-Life 2 episode, Ravenholm, and took this as evidence that the Half-Life 2 toolset was exhausted. The designer Robin Walker said Valve used Half-Life games to "solve some interesting collision of technology and art that had reared itself". Working on Episode Three, they failed to find a unifying idea that provided a sense of "wonderment, or opening, or expansion".

Valve released little information after announcing Episode Three, with no clarity on whether further Half-Life games were coming. Concept art appeared in 2007. In 2011, Wired described Episode Three as vaporware. In 2017, Business Insider described it as "the world's most anticipated game", but said that it had become a "farce".

Valve eventually abandoned episodic development, as they wanted to create more ambitious games. According to the level designer Dario Casali, "We found ourselves creeping ever forward towards, 'Well, let's just keep putting more and more, and more, and more stuff in this game because we want to make it as good as we can,' and then we realized these episodes are turning more into sequels."

After completing other projects, such as the multiplayer game Left 4 Dead (2008), Valve felt the opportunity to create Episode Three had passed. Additionally, Valve had started developing a new game engine, Source 2. As developing Half-Life 2 and the original Source engine simultaneously had created problems, Valve delayed development of a new Half-Life until Source 2 was complete. Speyrer said this was wrong in hindsight and that Valve could have completed it in two years. Newell felt completing it just to continue the story would have been a "cop-out", and said: "The failure, my personal failure, was being stumped. I couldn't figure out why doing Episode Three was pushing anything forward."

== Short story by Laidlaw ==
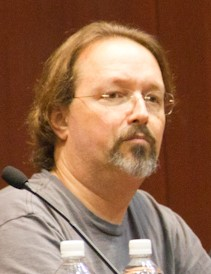
Marc Laidlaw, the writer of the Half-Life games until 2016

Laidlaw left Valve in 2016. He said later that he had tired of the FPS genre and was "less interested in trying to solve the story problems inherent in a Half-Life style of narrative". In 2017, Laidlaw posted a short story titled "Epistle 3" on his website, describing it as "a snapshot of a dream I had many years ago". It features characters with names similar to Half-Life characters, such as Gertie Fremont for Gordon Freeman. Journalists interpreted the story as a synopsis of what could have been the plot for Episode Three, or for Borealis, another canceled project led by Laidlaw.

Substituting the characters and locations with their Half-Life counterparts, "Epistle 3" has Gordon and Alyx travel to the Arctic to board the Borealis, a ship that travels erratically through time and space, where they confront alternative versions of themselves. They rig the Borealis to travel to the heart of the alien Combine empire and self-destruct. Before it explodes, the mysterious G-Man extracts Alyx and Gordon is rescued by the friendly Vortigaunt aliens.

Walker denied that the story had been Valve's plan for Episode Three, and said that it was likely just one of many ideas by Laidlaw. In a 2023 interview, Laidlaw said it did not represent what Episode Three could have been, as "all the real story development can only happen in the crucible of developing the game". He stressed that he had not given the team directives based on the story, and instead would have developed the story alongside the game features: "I still don't know what that would have been if we'd built it because it hadn't been built."

Laidlaw's "Epistle 3" story triggered a backlash from fans who took it as evidence that Valve had abandoned the Half-Life series. Some review bombed Valve's game Dota 2 on Valve's distribution service, Steam. The "Epistle 3" story also inspired fan games. Laidlaw said he regretted publishing it, as it had created problems for his former colleagues at Valve, and that he had been "deranged" and "completely out of touch" at the time.

== Legacy ==
After canceling several further Half-Life games, Valve released a VR game, Half-Life: Alyx, in 2020. Walker said Valve saw VR as a way to return to Half-Life. Phil Iwaunik of PCGamesN wrote in 2021 that the cancelation of Episode Three may have benefited the legacy of Half-Life 2, citing the lack of cultural impact of Alyx and the "mystery, speculation and melancholy" of an unfinished sequel. In 2024, Valve released footage and concept art of Episode Three as part of a documentary about the making of Half-Life 2. In 2026, parts of the source code for Episode Three were leaked online revealing previously unseen game mechanics and content.
