= Kamillions =

1990 film by Mike B. Anderson

- Rare theatrical release poster33
- Directed by: Mikel B. Anderson
- Written by: Robert Hsi (story); Mikel B. Anderson (screenplay); Harry S. Robins (screenplay)
- Produced by: Robert Hsi; Teresa Woo; Sally Aw (executive); Ning-Ping Chan (associate)
- Starring: Christopher Gasti; Dru-Anne Cakmis; Kate Alexander; Dan Evans; Laura O'Malley; Chuck Bartelle; David Allan Shaw; Andrew Ross Litzky; Allison Rachel Golde; Harry S. Robins
- Cinematography: Kathleen Beeler
- Edited by: Ian L. Turner
- Music by: Kent H. Randolph
- Distributed by: Ulysses Pictures
- Release date: October 4, 1990
- Running time: 90 min.
- Country: United States
- Language: English

Kamillions is a 1990 film directed by Mikel B. Anderson from a story by Robert Hsi and a screenplay Anderson wrote in collaboration with Harry S. Robins. The film was re-edited by producer Teresa Woo, who later admitted she did not really understand an English language science fiction comedy, and was expecting more of an action film. The film was shot primarily in the Dunsmuir House and Gardens in Oakland, California.

In the film, a mad scientist creates a portal to another dimension and accidentally transports two other-dimensional shapeshifters to Earth. Both aliens assume human form, but they demonstrate different personality traits. The female is friendly and amorous, and proceeds to find herself a boyfriend. The male is a trickster with sadistic tendencies, hurting people for his own amusement.

== Plot ==
Robins plays bumbling mad scientist Nathaniel Pickman Wingate, of the Miskatonic University. He works on opening a portal to another dimension while his wife, Nancy (Laura O'Malley) and family prepare his fiftieth birthday party. When he succeeds with contact with the new dimension, two triops-like creatures escape. These creatures possess shape-shifting abilities that allows them to assume the form and identity of anything, and thusly do so with Nancy's cousin, Count Desmon (Christopher Gasti) of Liechtenstein and Jasmine, a model from son Sam's (Dan Evans) poster (Dru-Anne Cakmis).

Jasmine and Desmon are shown to be polar behavioral opposites. Jasmine is friendly and intelligent. Via her telepathic abilities she quickly becomes Sam's girlfriend. Desmon on the other hand is ill-behaved, surly, and mischievously malevolent. His mischievous personality drives him to pull terrible tricks on Sam's family via his powers—for example, Lindy (Allison Rachel Golde) overuses the phone, so Desmon stuffs the receiver in her mouth, causing her to go to the ER to have it extracted. Handyman Floyd (Chuck Bartelle) is hurt by some cut wires a vindictive Desmon moves with psychokinesis giving him a severe electric shock.

Suffering difficulties in retaining his new body, Desmon frightens off the maid Emma (Lynn Applebaum) when he tries to seduce her. Reverend Lawrence Newman (David Allan Shaw), Nathan's college roommate, tries some bedroom antics with Nathan's sister, Angelica (Kate Alexander); Desmon, clinging to the ceiling above them, uses his powers to transform Lawrence's penis into a dragon-like creature that attacks him.

Sam, Jasmine and Sam's best friend, Alex (Andrew Ross Litzky) run to get coolant supplies from the university, which are necessary to prevent an explosion that will destroy half the planet. Jasmine is concerned with doing anything she can to stop Desmon and get back to their own dimension. She spends time, though, with Sam in a '50s-style malt shop, sharing a milkshake with two straws.

== Edit ==
The film came in at 121 minutes in a rough cut that Robins believed to be the director's cut until Anderson corrected him. Robins continues to pay to have the original elements stored in refrigeration in hopes of a director's cut, which the 90 minute cut released on video and television is not. According to Anderson, such a cut would be longer than 90 minutes, but shorter than 121 minutes. Robins's late brother, Jeff, barely appears in the 90 minute cut (in the malt shop scene, and in the party scene that ends the film), but has a larger supporting role (Albert) that has been essentially excluded from release. The film was sold in German-speaking markets as The Wingates. The film was shopped around outside the hands of any of the creators, and the VHS released that cropped up from a company called SBM of Chatsworth, California in 1991 was not authorized, and Robins, who subsequently acquired the rights to the film, dislikes the artwork. The packaging compares the film to David Cronenberg's The Fly and Joe Dante's Gremlins. Unlike Dante, the film is more concerned with social comedy than referential comedy. Teresa Woo was more used to action films like the Iron Angels series she was involved with, was confused by the brevity of fighting action in the film and whittled it down accordingly, though later regretted it.
