= Marc Laidlaw =

American writer

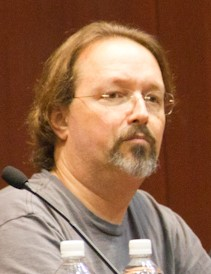
- Laidlaw in 2011
- Education: University of Oregon
- Occupation: Writer
- Writing career
- Language: English
- Genres: Science fiction, horror, video games
- Website: marclaidlaw.com

Marc Laidlaw is an American writer. Between 1997 and 2016, he was a writer for the video game company Valve, where he worked on the Half-Life and Portal series.

Before joining Valve, Laidlaw was a novelist working in fantasy and horror. In 1996 he won the International Horror Guild Award for his novel The 37th Mandala. In 2025, Laidlaw's 1983 short story "400 Boys" was adapted as an episode of the Netflix series Love, Death & Robots.

== Career ==
Laidlaw attended the University of Oregon, where he tried, and was discouraged by, punched card computer programming. While working at the Pacific Gas and Electric Company, Laidlaw wrote the novel Dad's Nuke, which he followed with the novels 37th Mandala, Kalifornia and The Orchid Eater. He wrote a series of articles for Wired profiling the video game developer id Software. He was commissioned to write a novelization of the FMV adventure game Gadget by the Japanese developer Synergy. Gadget was unsuccessful, but Laidlaw was excited by the creative process of game development. While writing another id profile, he began asking about game design and exploring opportunities in the industry.

=== 1997–2016: Valve ===
In July 1997, Laidlaw joined the video game company Valve while they were developing their first game, the first-person shooter (FPS) Half-Life (1998). He was hired to work on another game, Prospero, but switched when it was cancelled and the Half-Life project expanded. Laidlaw said his contribution was to add "old storytelling tricks" to Valve's ambitious designs. Rather than dictate narrative elements, he worked with the team to improvise ideas and was inspired by their experiments. He contributed to the "visual grammar" of the level design and focused on "doing storytelling with the architecture ... The narrative had to be baked into the corridors."

For Half-Life 2 (2004), Valve developed the characterization. Laidlaw created family relationships between the characters, saying it was a "basic dramatic unit everyone understands" that was rarely used in games. He also worked on Half-Life 2: Episode One (2006) and Half-Life 2: Episode Two (2007), plus several canceled Half-Life projects, including Half-Life 2: Episode Three and a virtual reality (VR) game set on a time-travelling ship. Laidlaw said he had intended Episode Three to end the Half-Life 2 story arc, at which point he would "step away from it and leave it to the next generation". In 2012, Laidlaw started a Twitter account to tell a story about the Half-Life 2 character Dr Breen. He described the story as "fan fiction", and wrote: "I personally cannot give the world a Half-Life game. All I can personally do, at least for now, is stuff like this."

Laidlaw also contributed to Valve's puzzle series Portal, which is set in the Half-Life universe. He disliked the crossover, feeling it "made both universes smaller", and said later: "I just had to react as gracefully as I could to the fact that it was going there without me. It didn't make any sense except from a resource-restricted point of view."

=== 2016–present: Departure from Valve ===
Laidlaw announced his departure from Valve in January 2016. He said the primary reason for his departure was his age, and that he planned to return to writing stories. He felt he was becoming a "negative force" at Valve and hampering the creative process, saying: "I think at some point you need to let the people who are the fans and the creators who've come in because of what they learned from you maybe, and let them have that. We didn't need me going, 'Well, the G-Man wouldn't do that in my day.'" Laidlaw also tired of the FPS genre and of solving storytelling problems in a Half-Life-style narrative. He said he had "always hoped that we'd stumble into a more expansive vocabulary or grammar for storytelling within the FPS medium, one that would let you do more than shoot or push buttons, or push crates".

On August 25, 2017, Laidlaw published a short story, "Epistle 3", describing it as "a snapshot of a dream I had many years ago". Journalists interpreted it as a summary of what could have been the plot for Half-Life 2: Episode Three. Laidlaw denied this, saying "all the real story development can only happen in the crucible of developing the game". In 2023, Laidlaw said he regretted publishing the story. He said he had been "deranged" and "completely out of touch" at the time, and that it had created problems for his former colleagues at Valve.

In 2020, Valve released the VR game Half-Life: Alyx. Laidlaw denied reports that he had provided consultation, saying he had confidence in the writers Jay Pinkerton and Erik Wolpaw and that he did not want them "second-guessing" him. As of 2023, Laidlaw had not played Alyx and said: "I don't ever need to see another Combine soldier again, not even in VR." He said he would not be interested in returning for future Half-Life games, but remained open to working with other game studios.

In 2018, Laidlaw completed a new novel, Underneath the Oversea, but could not find a publisher and self-published it on Kindle. He said the publishing world had "forgotten who he was" and that his age prevented publishers from building a new audience. In 2025, Laidlaw's short story "400 Boys", published in 1983, was adapted as an episode of the Netflix series Love, Death & Robots. Laidlaw was not involved in the production, and said "it just was fun to sit back and not have to be involved in the trenches on something for once".

== Personal life ==
In 2003, Laidlaw said his favorite games included the Legend of Zelda series, Animal Crossing, Um Jammer Lammy, Castlevania: Symphony of the Night, Ico, Fatal Frame and Thief: The Dark Project. After leaving Valve, Laidlaw moved to Kauai, Hawaii. He moved to Los Angeles in 2020. He has an amateur radio license and his call sign is WH6FXC. Laidlaw also writes and records music.

== Bibliography ==
=== Novels ===
- Dad's Nuke (1985)
- Neon Lotus (1988)
- Kalifornia (1993)
- The Orchid Eater (1994)
- The Third Force (1996), Gadget game tie-in
- The 37th Mandala (1996), nominated for the 1997 World Fantasy Award and awarded the 1996 International Horror Guild Award
- White Spawn (2015)
- Underneath the Oversea (2018)

=== Short fiction ===
Stories (Note: Short stories unless otherwise noted.)

Title	Year	First published	Reprinted/collected	Notes
"A Hiss of Dragon"	1979	Laidlaw, Marc (1979). "A Hiss of Dragon". The Best Science Fiction of the Year 8. with Gregory Benford, edited by Terry Carr, 1979		
"Tissue"	1980	Laidlaw, Marc (July 1980). "Tissue". New Terrors. edited by Ramsey Campbell, 1980		
"400 Boys"	1983	Laidlaw, Marc (November 1983). "400 Boys". Omni.	Bruce Sterling, Mirrorshades: The Cyberpunk Anthology, 1986	
"Probability Pipeline"	1988	Laidlaw, Marc (1988). "Probability Pipeline". Synergy: New Science Fiction, Volume 2. with Rudy Rucker, edited by George Zebrowski, 1988		The Delbert and Zeb sequence
"Chaos Surfari"	1989	Laidlaw, Marc (1989). "Chaos Surfari". Interzone. with Rudy Rucker, 1989		The Delbert and Zeb sequence
"Dankden"	1995	Laidlaw, Marc (October–November 1995). "Dankden". F&SF.		The Bard Gorlen series
"The Perfect Wave"	2008	Rucker, Rudy & Marc Laidlaw (January 2008). "The Perfect Wave". Asimov's Science Fiction.		
"Songwood"	2010	Laidlaw, Marc (January–February 2010). "Songwood". F&SF. Vol. 118, no. 1&2. pp. 82–97.		The Bard Gorlen series
"Watergirl"	2015	Rucker, Rudy & Marc Laidlaw (January 2015). "Watergirl". Asimov's Science Fiction. Vol. 39, no. 1. pp. 22–40.		

The Bard Gorlen series

- "Catamounts" (September 1996, The Magazine of Fantasy and Science Fiction)
- "Childrun" (August 2008, The Magazine of Fantasy and Science Fiction)
- "Quickstone" (March 2009, The Magazine of Fantasy and Science Fiction)
- "Bemused" (September/October 2013, The Magazine of Fantasy and Science Fiction)
- "Rooksnight" (May/June 2014, The Magazine of Fantasy and Science Fiction)
- "Catamounts" (Reprint) (August 2013, Lightspeed)
- "Belweather" (September 2013, Lightspeed)
- "Stillborne" (November/December 2017, The Magazine of Fantasy and Science Fiction)
- "Weeper" (September/October 2020, The Magazine of Fantasy and Science Fiction)
- "Underneath the Oversea" (November 2020)

=== Music ===
- Sombre Hombre EP (2023)

== Games ==
Year	Title
1998	Half-Life
2004	Half-Life 2
2006	Half-Life 2: Episode One
2007	Half-Life 2: Episode Two
2013	Dota 2
