= Vaporware =

Computer-related product announced but never released

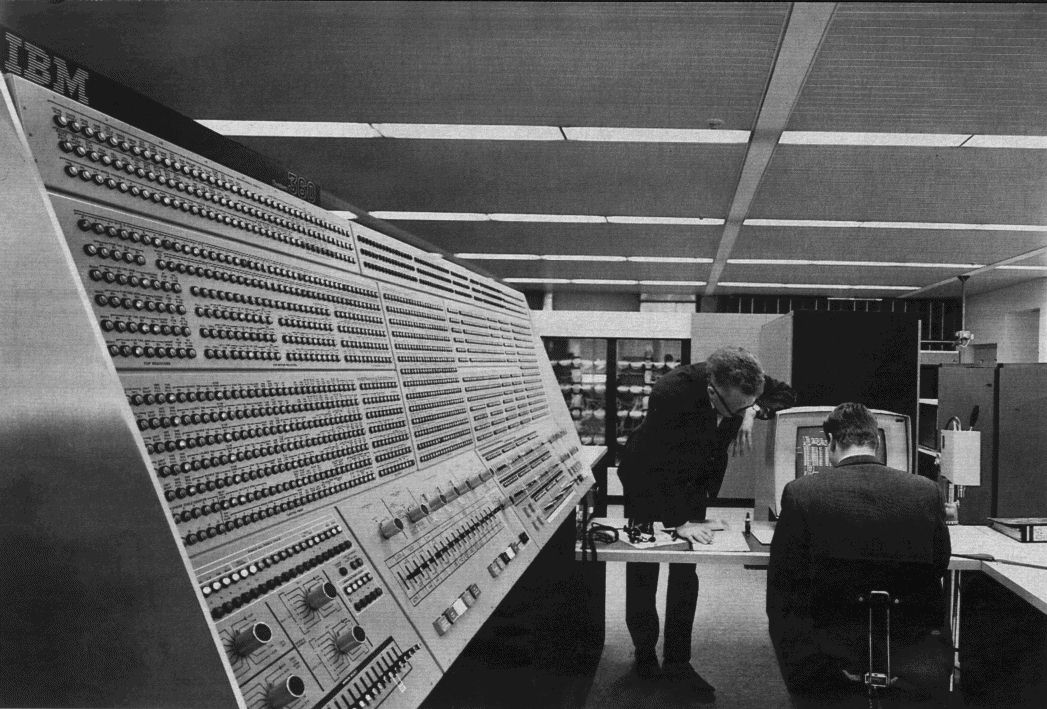
The U.S. Justice Department accused IBM of intentionally announcing its IBM System/360 Model 91 computer (pictured) nearly two years early to hurt sales of its competitor's computer.

In the computer industry, vaporware (or vapourware) is a product, typically computer hardware or software, that is announced to the general public but is significantly delayed, never released, does not meet expectations, or is canceled.

Vaporware is often announced months or years before its purported release, with few details about its development being released. Developers have been accused of intentionally promoting vaporware to keep customers from switching to competing products that offer more features. Network World magazine called vaporware an "epidemic" in 1989 and blamed the press for not investigating if developers' claims were true. Seven major companies issued a report in 1990 saying that they felt vaporware had hurt the industry's credibility. The United States accused several companies of announcing vaporware early enough to violate antitrust laws, but few have been found guilty.

== Etymology ==
"Vaporware", sometimes synonymous with "vaportalk" in the 1980s, has no single definition. It is generally used to describe a hardware or software product that has been announced, but that the developer is unlikely to release any time soon, if ever.

The first reported use of the word was in 1982 by an engineer at the computer software company Microsoft. Ann Winblad, president of Open Systems Accounting Software, wanted to know if Microsoft planned to stop developing its Xenix operating system as some of Open System's products depended on it. She asked two Microsoft software engineers, John Ulett and Mark Ursino, who confirmed that development of Xenix had stopped. "One of them told me, 'Basically, it's vaporware'" she later said. Winblad compared the word to the idea of "selling smoke", implying Microsoft was selling a product it would soon not support.

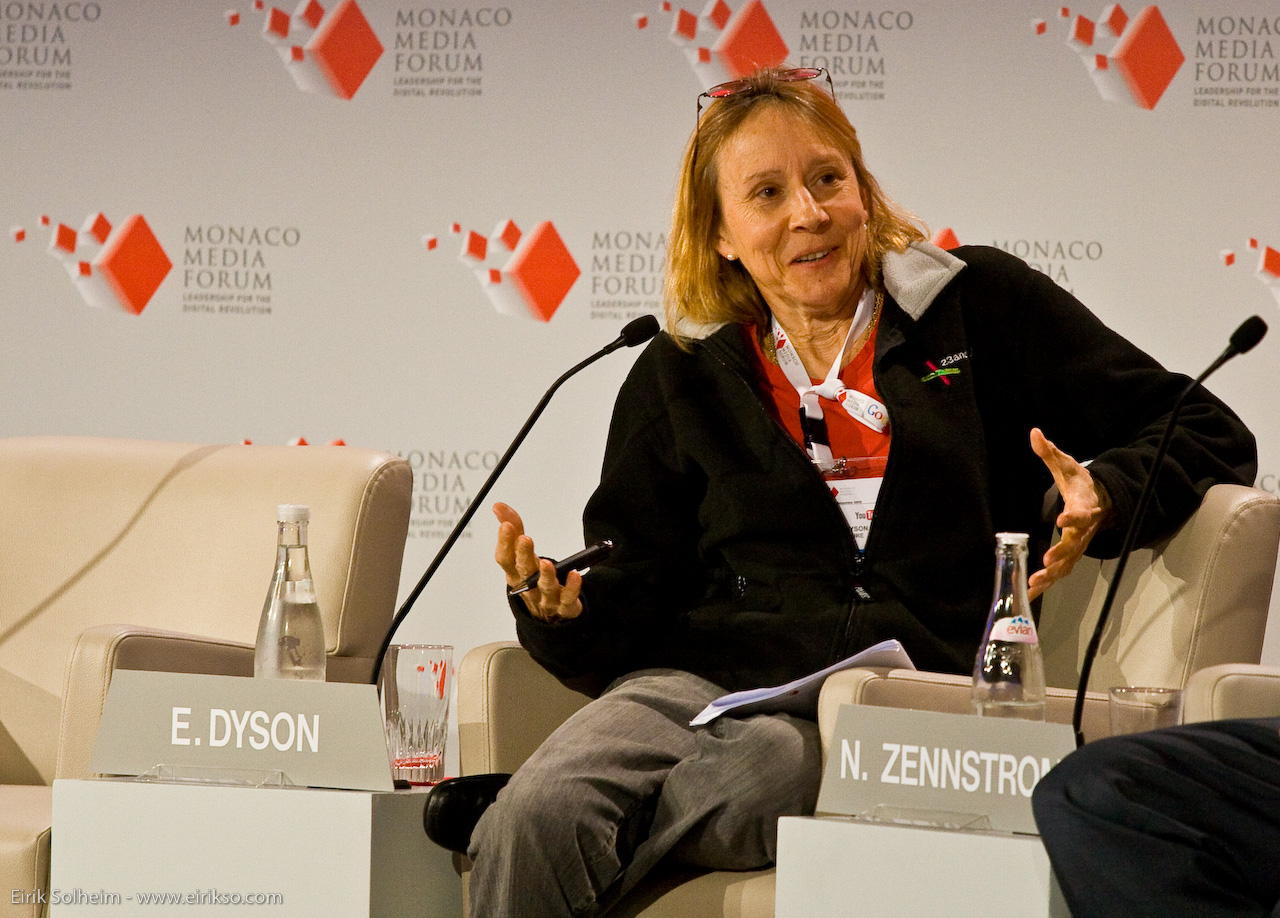
Influential writer Esther Dyson (pictured here in 2008) popularized the term "vaporware" in her November 1983 issue of RELease 1.0.

Winblad described the word to influential computer expert Esther Dyson, who published it for the first time in her monthly newsletter RELease 1.0. In an article titled "Vaporware" in the November 1983 issue of RELease 1.0, Dyson defined the word as "good ideas incompletely implemented". She described three software products shown at COMDEX in Las Vegas that year with bombastic advertisements. She stated that demonstrations of the "purported revolutions, breakthroughs and new generations" at the exhibition did not meet those claims.

The practice existed before Winblad's account. In a January 1982 review of the new IBM Personal Computer, BYTE favorably noted that IBM "refused to acknowledge the existence of any product that is not ready to be put on dealers' shelves tomorrow. Although this is frustrating at times, it is a refreshing change from some companies' practice of announcing a product even before its design is finished". When discussing Coleco's delay in releasing the Adam, Creative Computing in March 1984 stated that the company "did not invent the common practice of debuting products before they actually exist. In microcomputers, to do so otherwise would be to break with a veritable tradition". Recalling that a Lanier Business Products word processor became available immediately after its announcement, Creative Computing wrote that year, "If we were to re-enact that scene today, I wouldn't get my machine for at least six months, maybe a year".

After Dyson's article, the word "vaporware" became popular among writers in the personal computer software industry as a way to describe products they believed took too long to be released after their first announcement. InfoWorld magazine editor Stewart Alsop helped popularize its use by giving Bill Gates, then-CEO of Microsoft, with a Golden Vaporware award for Microsoft releasing Windows in 1985, 18 months late. Alsop presented it to Gates at a celebration for the release while the song "The Impossible Dream" played in the background.

"Vaporware" took another meaning when it was used to describe a product that did not exist. A new company named Ovation Technologies announced its office suite Ovation in 1983. The company invested in an advertising campaign that promoted Ovation as a "great innovation", and showed a demonstration of the program at computer trade shows. The demonstration was well received by writers in the press, was featured in a cover story for an industry magazine, and reportedly created anticipation among potential customers. Executives later revealed that Ovation never existed. The company created the fake demonstration in an unsuccessful attempt to raise money to finish their product, and is "widely considered the mother of all vaporware", according to Laurie Flynn of The New York Times.

Use of the term spread beyond the computer industry. Newsweek magazine's Allan Sloan described the manipulation of stocks by Yahoo! and Amazon.com as "financial vaporware" in 1997. Popular Science magazine uses a scale ranging from "vaporware" to "bet on it" to describe release dates of new consumer electronics. Car manufacturer General Motors' plans to develop and sell an electric car were called vaporware by an advocacy group in 2008 and Car and Driver magazine retroactively described the Vector W8 supercar as vaporware in 2017.

== Causes and use ==
=== Late release ===
The term is like a scarlet letter hung around the neck of software developers. [...] Like any overused and abused word, vaporware has lost its meaning.

— James Fawcette, "Press' Vaporgate", 1985

A product missing its announced release date, and the labeling of it as vaporware by the press, can be caused by its development taking longer than planned. Most software products are not released on time, according to researchers in 2001 who studied the causes and effects of vaporware; "I hate to say yes, but yes", a Microsoft product manager stated in 1984, adding that "the problem isn't just at Microsoft". The phenomenon is so common that Lotus' release of 1-2-3 on time in January 1983, three months after announcing it, amazed many. When Lotus Notes appeared in 1989, the company said "Notes is coming off the vaporware list".

Software development is a complex process, and developers are often uncertain how long it will take to complete any given project. Fixing errors in software, for example, can make up a significant portion of its development time, and developers are motivated not to release software with errors because it could damage their reputation with customers. Last-minute design changes are also common. Large organizations seem to have more late projects than smaller ones, and may benefit from hiring individual programmers on contract to write software rather than using in-house development teams. Adding people to a late software project does not help; according to Brooks' Law, doing so increases the delay.

Not all delays in software are the developers' fault. In 1986, the American National Standards Institute adopted SQL as the standard database manipulation language. Software company Ashton-Tate was ready to release dBase IV, but pushed the release date back to add support for SQL. The company believed that the product would not be competitive without it. As the word became more commonly used by writers in the mid-1980s, InfoWorld magazine editor James Fawcette wrote that its negative connotations were unfair to developers because of these types of circumstances.

==== Duke Nukem ====
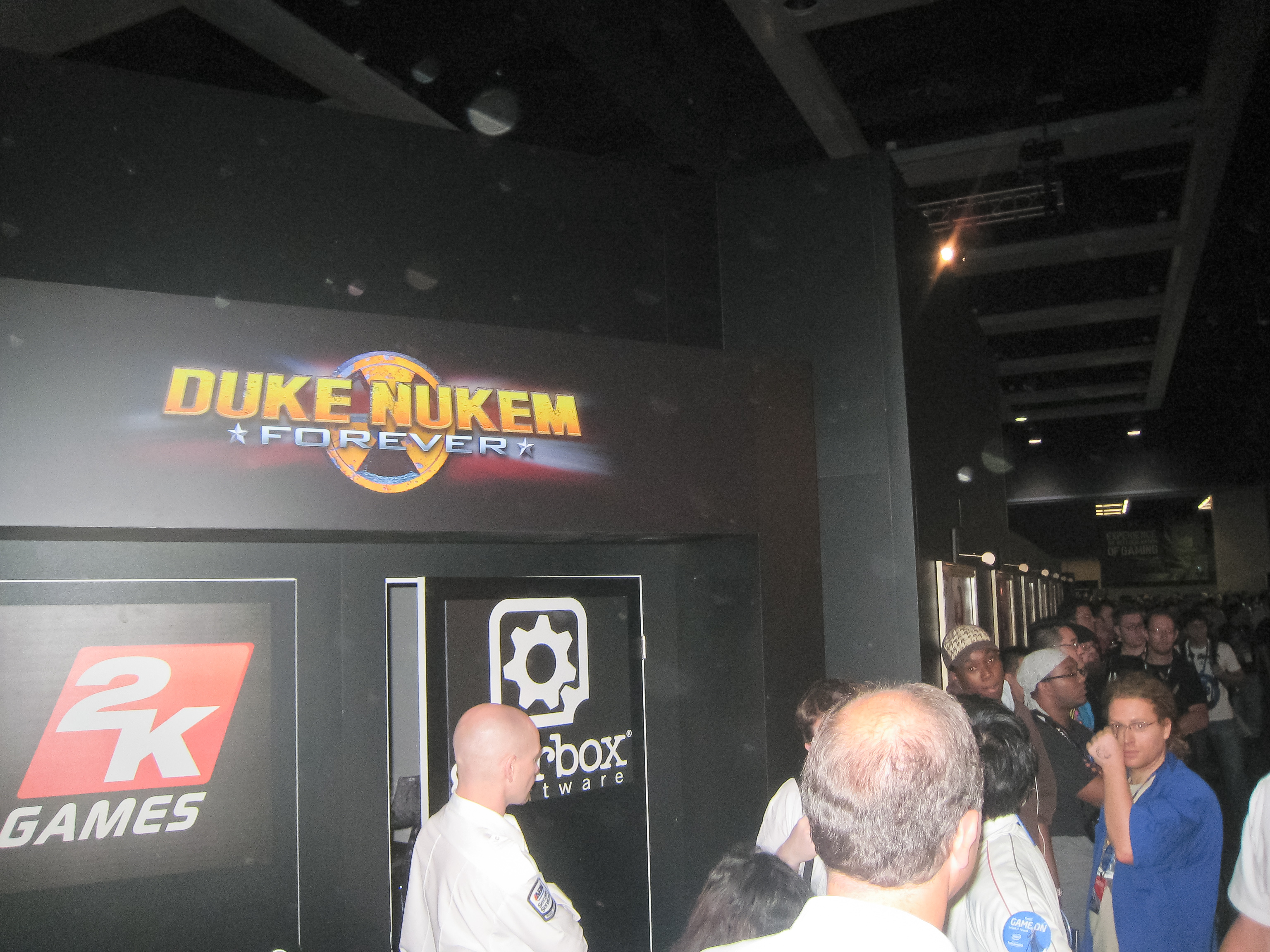
Duke Nukem Forever booth at PAX Prime 2010

Vaporware also includes announced products that are never released because of financial problems, or because the industry changes during its development. When 3D Realms first announced Duke Nukem Forever in 1997, the video game was early in its development. The company's previous game released in 1996, Duke Nukem 3D, was a critical and financial success, and customer anticipation for its sequel was high. As personal computer hardware speeds improved at a rapid pace in the late 1990s, it created an "arms race" between companies in the video game industry, according to Wired News. 3D Realms repeatedly moved the release date back over the next 12 years to add new, more advanced features. By the time 3D Realms went out of business in 2009 with the game still unreleased, Duke Nukem Forever had become synonymous with the word "vaporware" among industry writers. The game was revived and released in 2011. However, due to a 13-year period of fan anticipation and design changes in the industry, the game received a mostly negative reception from critics and fans.

A company notorious for vaporware can improve its reputation. In the 1980s, video game maker Westwood Studios was known for shipping products late. However, by 1993, it had improved so much that Computer Gaming World reported "many publishers would assure [us] that a project was going to be completed on time because Westwood was doing it".

=== Early announcement ===
Announcing products early—months or years before their release date, also called "preannouncing", has been an effective way by some developers to make their products successful. It can be seen as a legitimate part of their marketing strategy, but is generally not popular with industry press. The first company to release a product in a given market often gains an advantage. It can set the standard for similar future products, attract a large number of customers, and establish its brand before competitor's products are released. Public relations firm Coakley-Heagerty used an early announcement in 1984 to build interest among potential customers. Its client was Nolan Bushnell, formerly of Atari Inc. who wanted to promote the new Sente Technologies, but his contract with Atari prohibited doing so until a later date. The firm created an advertising campaign—including brochures and a shopping-mall appearance—around a large ambiguous box covered in brown paper to increase curiosity until Sente could be announced.

Early announcements send signals not only to customers and the media, but also to providers of support products, regulatory agencies, financial analysts, investors, and other parties. For example, an early announcement can relay information to vendors, letting them know to prepare marketing and shelf space. It can signal third-party developers to begin work on their own products, and it can be used to persuade a company's investors that they are actively developing new, profitable ideas. Microsoft described this in 1995, during United States v. Microsoft, as "not in fact vaporware, but pre-disclosure" if not done with "a desire to mislead". When IBM announced its Professional Workstation computer in 1986, they noted the lack of third-party programs written for it at the time, signaling those developers to start preparing. Microsoft usually announces information about its operating systems early because third-party developers are dependent on that information to develop their own products. Gates said in 1987 that while his company did not preannounce applications, "In the case of systems software, I think you've got to make statements of direction ... We really bring people in and go into it in great detail". Alsop proposed in 1995 that instead of early public announcements, companies should, using nondisclosure agreements, privately notify important customers.

A developer can strategically announce a product that is in the early stages of development, or before development begins, to gain competitive advantage over other developers. In addition to the "vaporware" label, this is also called "ambush marketing", and "fear, uncertainty and doubt" (FUD) by the press. If the announcing developer is a large company, this may be done to influence smaller companies to stop development of similar products. The smaller company might decide their product will not be able to compete, and that it is not worth the development costs. It can also be done in response to a competitor's already-released product. The goal is to make potential customers believe a second, better product will be released soon. The customer might reconsider buying from the competitor, and wait. In 1994, as customer anticipation increased for Microsoft's new version of Windows (codenamed "Chicago"), Apple announced a set of upgrades to its own System 7 operating system that were not due to be released until nearly two years later. The Wall Street Journal wrote that Apple did this to "blunt Chicago's momentum".

A premature announcement can cause others to respond with their own. When VisiCorp announced Visi On in November 1982, it promised to ship the product by spring 1983. The news forced Quarterdeck Office Systems to announce in April 1983 that its DESQ would ship in November 1983. Microsoft responded by announcing Windows 1.0 in fall 1983, and Ovation Technologies followed by announcing Ovation in November. InfoWorld noted in May 1984 that of the four products only Visi On had shipped, albeit more than a year late and with only two supported applications.

my own estimate is that at the time of announcement, 10% of software products don't actually exist [...] Vendors that are unwilling to [prove it exists] shouldn't announce their packages to the press

— Joe Mohen, "vaporware epidemic", 1989

Industry publications widely accused companies of using early announcements intentionally to gain competitive advantage over others. In his 1989 Network World article, Joe Mohen wrote the practice had become a "vaporware epidemic", and blamed the press for not investigating claims by developers. "If the pharmaceutical industry were this careless, I could announce a cure for cancer today – to a believing press." In 1985 Stewart Alsop began publishing his influential monthly Vaporlist, a list of companies he felt announced their products too early, hoping to dissuade them from the practice; among the entries in January 1988 were a Verbatim Corp. optical drive that was 30 months late, WordPerfect for Macintosh (12 months), IBM OS/2 1.1 (nine months), and Lotus 1-2-3 for OS/2 and Macintosh (nine and three months late, respectively). Wired Magazine began publishing a similar list in 1997. Seven major software developers—including Ashton-Tate, Hewlett-Packard, and Sybase—formed a council in 1990, and issued a report condemning the "vacuous product announcement dubbed vaporware and other misrepresentations of product availability" because they felt it had hurt the industry's credibility.

== Antitrust allegations ==
In the United States, announcing a product that does not exist to gain a competitive advantage is illegal via Section 2 of the Sherman Antitrust Act of 1890, but few hardware or software developers have been found guilty of it. The section requires proof that the announcement is both provably false, and has actual or likely market impact. False or misleading announcements designed to influence stock prices are illegal under United States securities fraud laws. The complex and changing nature of the computer industry, marketing techniques, and lack of precedent for applying these laws to the industry can mean developers are not aware their actions are illegal. The U.S. Securities and Exchange Commission issued a statement in 1984 with the goal of reminding companies that securities fraud also applies to "statements that can reasonably be expected to reach investors and the trading markets".

Several companies have been accused in court of using knowingly false announcements to gain market advantage. In 1969, the United States Justice Department accused IBM of doing this in the case United States v. IBM. After IBM's competitor, Control Data Corporation (CDC), released a computer, IBM announced the System/360 Model 91. The announcement resulted in a significant reduction in sales of CDC's product. The Justice Department accused IBM of doing this intentionally because the System/360 Model 91 was not released until two years later. IBM avoided preannouncing products during the antitrust case, but after the case ended it resumed the practice. The company likely announced its PCjr in November 1983—four months before general availability in March 1984—to hurt sales of rival home computers during the important Christmas sales season. In 1985 The New York Times wrote:

Because of its position in the industry, an announcement of a future I.B.M. product, or even a rumor of one, is enough to slow competitors' sales. Some critics say that I.B.M. is trying to lock out competitors when it issues statements outlining the general trend of future products. I.B.M. insists the practice is necessary to help customer planning.

The practice was not called "vaporware" at the time, but publications have since used the word to refer specifically to it. Similar cases have been filed against Kodak, AT&T, and Xerox.

US District Judge Stanley Sporkin was a vocal opponent of the practice during his review of the settlement resulting from United States v. Microsoft Corp. in 1994. "Vaporware is a practice that is deceitful on its face and everybody in the business community knows it," said Sporkin. One of the accusations made during the trial was that Microsoft has illegally used early announcements. The review began when three anonymous companies protested the settlement, claiming the government did not thoroughly investigate Microsoft's use of the practice. Specifically, they claimed Microsoft announced its Quick Basic 3 program to slow sales of its competitor Borland's recently released Turbo Basic program. The review was dismissed for lack of explicit proof.

== See also ==
- List of vaporware
- List of commercial failures in video games
- Technology demonstration
- Osborne effect
- Development hell
- Abandonware
