= Ovation Technologies =

Early PC "vaporware" software company

- Formerly: Spectrum Group Inc.
- Company type: Private
- Industry: Software
- Founded: December 1982; 42 years ago in Canton, Massachusetts
- Founder: Thomas J. Gregory
- Defunct: 1984; 41 years ago
- Fate: Dissolved
- Products: Ovation (never released)

Ovation Technologies was a short-lived software company founded in Canton, Massachusetts, in December 1982 to create business productivity software for the then-emerging IBM PC and compatible market. Briefly named Spectrum Group Inc., the company was founded by Thomas J. Gregory, who also served as the company's president. Mike Walrod served as vice president of marketing.

Their intended product, also named "Ovation", was an integrated software suite aiming to compete against the industry leader at the time, Lotus 1-2-3. The company raised several million in capital and secured a distribution agreement with Tandy Corporation, including co-marketing with their line of Tandy 2000 computers. The "Ovation" project was led by chief software designer Robert Kutnik.

The company made impressive demonstrations, culminating with a high-profile news conference staged at Manhattan's Windows on the World restaurant, but ultimately they were unable to ship their product, and filed for bankruptcy by the end of 1984.

Ovation's most enduring claim to fame may be as what many consider to be the industry's first widely publicized and "most notorious" example of vaporware.
