= List of semiconductor companies by country =

Semiconductor companies by country

This is a list of semiconductor companies by country organized by the country in which they are headquartered. The list includes companies involved in semiconductor device fabrication, integrated circuit design, fabless manufacturing, foundry services, packaging and testing, semiconductor manufacturing equipment, semiconductor materials, and related electronic design automation and semiconductor intellectual property.

== Australia ==
- BrainChip

== Austria ==
- AMS-Osram
- AT&S
- CISC Semiconductor
- Infineon Technologies Austria

== Brazil ==
- CEITEC

== Canada ==
- ATS Corporation
- Teledyne DALSA

== China ==
- AAC Technologies
- Actions Technology
- Advanced Micro-Fabrication Equipment
- Allwinner Technology
- Beijing Huafeng Test & Control Technology
- Biren Technology
- Black Sesame Technologies
- Brite Semiconductor
- Cambricon Technologies
- ChangXin Memory Technologies
- China Resources Microelectronics
- Dongfang Jingyuan Electron Limited
- Empyrean Technology
- Enflame
- Espressif Systems
- Fujian Jinhua Integrated Circuit
- GigaDevice
- Goodix
- Guoxin Micro
- Hangzhou Changchuan Technology
- Hangzhou Silan Microelectronics
- Hejian Technology Corporation
- HiSilicon
- Horizon Robotics
- Hua Hong Semiconductor
- Huatian Technology
- Hubei Dinglong
- Hwatsing Technology
- Hygon Information Technology
- Iluvatar CoreX
- InfoTM
- Ingenic Semiconductor
- Innoscience
- JCET
- Jingjia Micro
- Kingsemi
- Kunlunxin
- Leadcore Technology
- Lightelligence
- Lisuan Tech
- Loongson
- Maxscend Microelectronics
- MetaX
- Montage Technology
- Moore Threads
- National Silicon Industry Group
- Naura Technology
- Nexchip
- OmniVision Group
- Piotech
- PNC Process Systems
- Rockchip
- Sanan Optoelectronics
- Semiconductor Manufacturing International Corporation
- SG Micro
- Shanghai Micro Electronics Equipment
- Shanghai Wanye Enterprises
- SiCarrier
- Silergy
- SJ Semiconductor
- Skyverse Technology
- Suzhou Oriental Semiconductor
- T-Head
- Tongfu Microelectronics
- Tsinghua Unigroup
- UNISOC
- United Nova Technology
- Vimicro
- Wingtech
- Wuhan Jingce Electronic Group
- XMC
- Yangtze Memory Technologies
- Yuanjie Semiconductor Technology
- Zhaoxin
- Zhejiang Jingsheng Mechanical & Electrical

== Finland ==
- Okmetic

== France ==
- CAMECA
- Kalray
- Lynred
- Soitec

== Germany ==
- Aixtron
- Bosch
- Carl Zeiss SMT
- COSEDA Technologies
- Elmos Semiconductor
- Infineon Technologies
- PVA TePla
- Siltronic
- SUSS MicroTec
- X-Fab

== India ==
- Tata Semiconductor Assembly and Test

== Israel ==
- Annapurna Labs
- Ceva
- Hailo Technologies
- Nova Ltd.
- Tower Semiconductor
- Valens Semiconductor
- Vayyar
- Weebit Nano

== Italy ==
- Technoprobe

== Japan ==
- Advantest
- AGC Inc.
- Asahi Kasei
- Canon Inc.
- Disco Corporation
- Ebara Corporation
- Fuji Electric
- Hamamatsu Photonics
- HOYA
- Ibiden
- Japan Advanced Semiconductor Manufacturing
- Kioxia
- Kokusai Electric
- Lasertec
- Mitsui Chemicals
- Mitsubishi Electric
- Nichia
- Nikon
- PEZY Computing
- Rapidus
- Renesas Electronics
- Rohm
- Screen Holdings
- Seiko Epson
- Shin-Etsu Chemical
- Shindengen Electric Manufacturing
- Socionext
- Sony
- SUMCO
- THine Electronics
- Tokyo Electron
- Toshiba
- Ulvac
- Yokogawa Electric
- Zuken

== Malaysia ==
- Silterra Malaysia

== Netherlands ==
- Ampleon
- ASM International
- ASML
- Axelera AI
- Besi
- Nexperia
- NXP Semiconductors

== Norway ==
- Nordic Semiconductor

== Poland ==
- Vigo Photonics

== Russia ==
- Angstrem
- Kremny EL
- MCST
- Mikron Group
- Proton-Electrotex

== Singapore ==
- ASMPT
- Silicon Box
- Systems on Silicon Manufacturing
- UTAC Group

== South Korea ==
- DB HiTek
- DI Corporation
- Hana Micron
- Hanmi Semiconductor
- Rebellions
- Samsung Electronics
- Samsung Electro-Mechanics
- Seoul Semiconductor
- SK Hynix
- SurplusGlobal
- Telechips

== Sweden ==
- Fingerprint Cards

== Switzerland ==
- Alpes Lasers
- EM Microelectronic
- OC Oerlikon
- STMicroelectronics
- U-blox

== Taiwan ==
- Alchip
- ALi Corporation
- Andes Technology
- ASE Group
- ASIX
- ASMedia
- Etron Technology
- Faraday Technology
- Global Unichip Corporation
- GlobalWafers
- Himax
- Holtek
- Macronix
- MediaTek
- Nuvoton
- Phison
- Powerchip
- Powertech Technology
- Realtek
- Silicon Integrated Systems
- Silicon Motion
- Siliconware Precision Industries
- Taiwan Semiconductor Company Limited
- TSMC
- United Microelectronics Corporation
- Vanguard International Semiconductor Corporation
- VIA Technologies
- Winbond

== United Kingdom ==
- Arm Holdings
- Dynex Semiconductor
- FTDI
- Graphcore
- Imagination Technologies
- IQE
- Oxford Instruments
- Pragmatic Semiconductor
- Raspberry Pi Holdings
- XMOS

== United States ==
- 3M
- Achronix
- ACM Research
- Advanced Energy
- Advanced Linear Devices
- Aldec
- Alereon
- Amazon
- AMD
- Ambarella Inc.
- Ambiq Micro
- Amkor Technology
- Amlogic
- Ampere Computing
- Analog Devices
- Apple
- Applied Materials
- Arteris
- Astera Labs
- Atomera
- Axcelis Technologies
- Bourns, Inc.
- Broadcom
- Cadence Design Systems
- Cerebras Systems
- Chelsio Communications
- Cirrus Logic
- Cisco
- Coherent Corp.
- Corning Inc.
- Crossbar, Inc.
- Diodes Incorporated
- Efficient Power Conversion
- Entegris
- ESS Technology
- Everspin Technologies
- FormFactor
- GlobalFoundries
- Google
- Greenliant Systems
- Groq
- Helix Semiconductors
- Hemlock Semiconductor
- Honeywell
- IBM
- Impinj
- Integra Technologies
- Intel
- Keysight Technologies
- KLA Corporation
- Lam Research
- Lattice Semiconductor
- Linear Integrated Systems
- Littelfuse
- MACOM Technology Solutions
- Marvell Technology
- Mattson Technology
- MaxLinear
- Meta Platforms
- Microchip Technology
- Micron Technology
- Microsoft
- MIPS Technologies
- MKS Instruments
- Monolithic Power Systems
- Multibeam Corporation
- NeoMagic
- Nvidia
- Onsemi
- Onto Innovation
- OpenAI
- Parallax, Inc.
- PDF Solutions
- Photronics
- Pixelworks
- Power Integrations
- Qnity Electronics
- Qorvo
- Qualcomm
- Rambus
- Rochester Electronics
- SambaNova Systems
- Sandisk
- Seagate Technology
- Semtech
- SiFive
- Silicon Labs
- Silvaco
- SiTime
- SkyWater Technology
- Skyworks Solutions
- Solidigm
- SpaceX
- Synaptics
- Synopsys
- Teradyne
- Tesla, Inc.
- Texas Instruments
- Veeco
- Vishay Intertechnology
- Western Design Center
- Western Digital
- Wolfspeed
- Zero ASIC
- Zilog

== See also ==
- List of computer hardware manufacturers
- List of DRAM manufacturers
- List of EDA companies
- List of foundry companies
- List of integrated circuit manufacturers
- List of semiconductor fabrication plants
- List of semiconductor journals
- List of semiconductor occupations
- List of system on a chip suppliers
- List of solid-state drive manufacturers
- Lists of companies
- Outline of semiconductors
- Semiconductor industry
