= JSG =

JSG may refer to:

- Jackson School of Geosciences
- Jade Solid Gold
- Jaydon Sciré Giesekam
- Jewish Socialists' Group
- Jean-Sébastien Giguère
- Jharsuguda railway station
- Stirling railway station, Perth
- Junk Shop Glam
- Zhejiang Jingsheng Mechanical & Electrical
