= T-head =

T-head may refer to:

- Anchor plate
- T-Head, semiconductor subsidiary of the Alibaba Group
- T-head engine
