= JCET =

JCET may refer to:

- JCET (company)
- Joint Combined Exchange Training
