= Advanced Micro-Fabrication Equipment =

Chinese semiconductor equipment manufacturer

Advanced Micro-Fabrication Equipment Inc. China
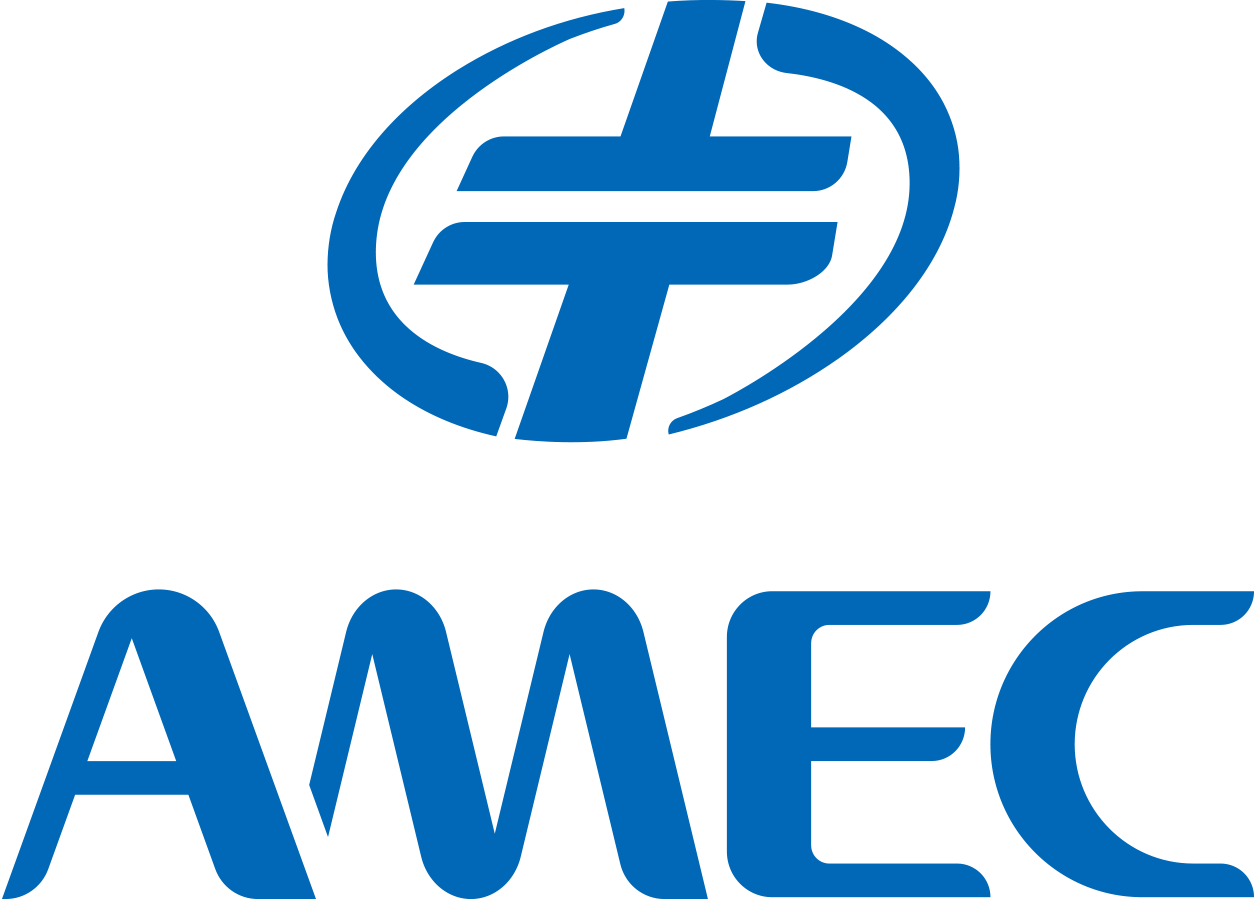
- Native name: 中微半导体设备（上海）股份有限公司
- Type: Public; partly state-owned
- Traded as: SSE: 688012; CSI A100
- Industry: Semiconductors
- Founded: 31 May 2004; 22 years ago
- Founder: Gerald Yin
- Headquarters: Shanghai, China
- Key people: Gerald Yin (Chairman & CEO)
- Revenue: ▲CN¥6.26 billion (2023)
- Net income: ▲CN¥1.78 billion (2023)
- Total assets: ▲CN¥21.53 billion (2023)
- Total equity: ▲CN¥17.82 billion (2023)
- Number of employees: 1,722 (2023)
- Website: www.amec-inc.com

Advanced Micro-Fabrication Equipment (AMEC; Chinese: 中微半导体设备; pinyin: Zhōngwēi Bàndǎotǐ Shèbèi) is a partially state-owned publicly listed Chinese company that manufactures semiconductor chip production equipment. It is currently one of the largest semiconductor equipment manufacturers in China.

== History ==
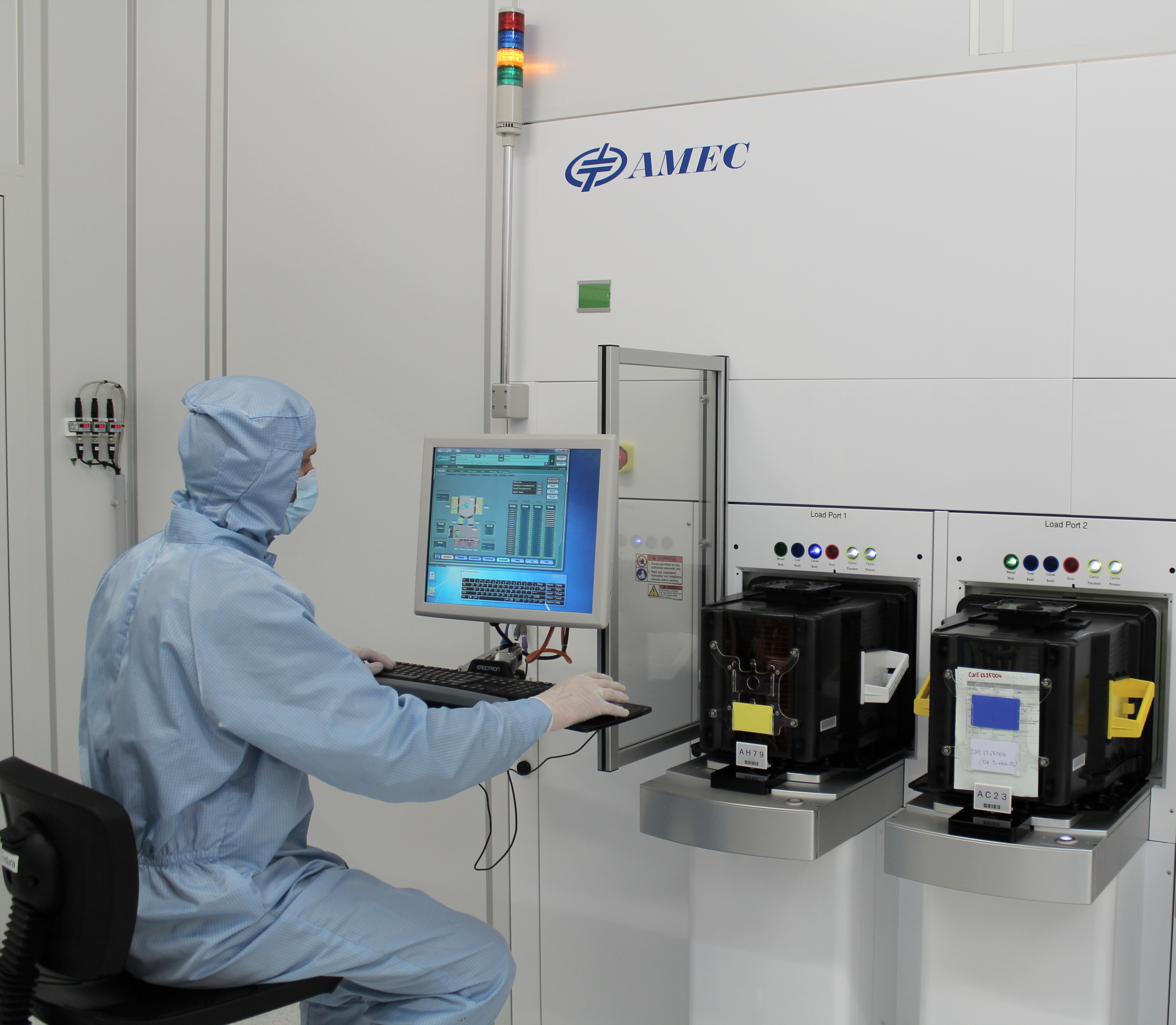
Etching area at a cleanroom

AMEC was co-founded in May 2004 by Gerald Yin who had previously worked at Applied Materials and Lam Research in China. Yin who was 60 at the time. Early investors in AMEC included Qualcomm and Samsung. Within three years, AMEC developed its own etching machine.

In 2007, Applied Materials filed a lawsuit against AMEC claiming that Yin and several other employees at the firm were all its former staff and were involved in patent problems. In 2010, the two companies reached a settlement where they agreed to jointly own the patent family.

In 2009, Lam Research field a patent lawsuit against AMEC in Taiwan but was dismissed by the court. In December 2010. AMEC launched a counterclaim against Lam Research in Shanghai alleging infringement of trade secrets related to plasma etching equipment. In March 2017, the court sided in favour of AMEC but Lam Research appealed the case. On 30 June 2023, the Shanghai High People's Court issued a final judgement in favour of AMEC. It was speculated AMEC's victory would allow to clear intellectual property barriers that Lam Research enacted to prevent it entering the Taiwan Market.

In 2017, Veeco filed a patent lawsuit against AMEC but in January 2018 Chinese customs detained Veeco's imported Metalorganic vapour-phase epitaxy (MOCVD) equipment on the grounds that it infringed AMEC's patents. The incident was seen as crucial leverage for AMEC. In February 2018, both sides reached a settlement agreement regarding the patent lawsuit.

On 22 July 2019, AMEC held its initial public offering becoming a publicly listed company on the Shanghai Stock Exchange STAR Market. The largest shareholders of AMEC include Shanghai Venture Capital Co., Hong Kong Exchanges and Clearing and the China Integrated Circuit Industry Investment Fund.

AMEC reported in July 2022, six of its executives including Yin planned to sell no more than 2.44 million shares in the following three months. This was done for a personal demand of cash. On 7 October that year, the United States New Export Controls on Advanced Computing and Semiconductors to China came into effect and the first trading day afterwards, shares of AMEC dropped more than 19%. On that day AMEC announced that Yin had sold 549,500 of the 6.43 million shares he owned for 74.4 million yuan (US$10.5 million) by the end of September. Prior to that announcement, Yin had never sold any of his shares after the company went public. However, despite speculations of insider trading, there was no evidence to suggest that AMEC's executives knew about the US government upcoming restriction controls when they sold their shares.

In September 2023, Yin stated that US import restrictions would have a negligible effect on AMEC's capacity to operate. 80% of imported equipment which was now restricted could be replaced by domestic alternatives by end of the year. By the second half of 2024, AMEC could resume full operational capacity due to China's drive to achieve semiconductor self-sufficiency.

On 31 January 2024, the United States Department of Defense (DOD) added AMEC to the Chinese Military Companies (CMC) list in accordance with Section 1260H of the National Defense Authorization Act for Fiscal Year 2021. It had been previously added on 14 January 2021 before being removed from the list on 3 June 2021. AMEC stated it has no connections to the People's Liberation Army and that the list had no specific sanctions which would have a material impact on its operations. In August 2024, AMEC announced it had filed a lawsuit against the DOD for adding it to the blacklist. In December 2024, AMEC was removed from the list again.

At the start of February 2024, AMEC announced a share repurchase plan valued at 300-500 million yuan (US$41.6-69.4 million). This was seen as the company's strong confidence in China's chip making industry.

In April 2025, Yin renounced his US citizenship and restored his Chinese nationality.

== Products ==
AMEC's Primo Nanova etching machines cover application for 14 nm, 7 nm and 5 nm processes. It is one of the five suppliers of etching equipment for TSMC's 7 nm production lines.

== See also ==
- Semiconductor industry in China
- Applied Materials
- Lam Research
