= Iluvatar CoreX =

Chinese artificial intelligence chip manufacturer

Shanghai Tianshu Zhixin Semiconductor Co. Ltd.
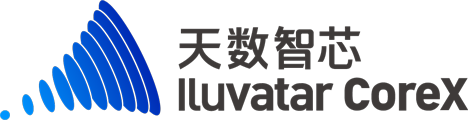
- Trade name: Iluvatar CoreX
- Native name: 上海天数智芯半导体有限公司
- Company type: Public
- Traded as: SEHK: 9903
- Industry: Semiconductors
- Founded: December 2015; 10 years ago
- Founder: Li Yunpeng
- Headquarters: Shanghai, China
- Website: www.iluvatar.com

Shanghai Tianshu Zhixin Semiconductor Co. Ltd. (Iluvatar CoreX; Chinese: 天数智芯; pinyin: Tiānshù Zhìxīn) is a Chinese technology company headquartered in Shanghai.

The company develops general-purpose computing on graphics processing units (GPGPUs) for use in the field of artificial intelligence (AI). It has been compared to Nvidia due to their similar focus.

== Background ==
Iluvatar CoreX was founded at the end of 2015 by Li Yunpeng who had previously at Oracle Corporation for 10 years.

Investors of Iluvatar CoreX have included Centurium Capital and HongShan. It has been noted for its strong government ties with partnerships with government entities such as Shanghai Supercomputer Center and CECport.

In May 2021, Diao Shijing was appointed as Iluvatar CoreX 's chairman and CEO. He was previously the co-president of Tsinghua Unigroup. In July 2022, Diao was taken away for investigation as part of the Chinese government's anti-graft probe.

In 2024, Iluvatar CoreX reached unicorn status with a valuation over US$1 billion.

On 8 January 2026, Iluvatar CoreX held its initial public offering on the Hong Kong Stock Exchange to become a listed company.

== Product history ==
ln January 2021, Iluvatar CoreX released the TianGai-100 series (also known as Big Island), a 7nm GPGPU used for training purposes. The performance was considered competitive to the Nvidia A100 and the AMD Instinct MI100. The product took four years of development and is used in cloud computing applications. Considered the first domestically produced 7nm GPGPU, it was seen as a possible challenger to the foreign monopoly in China. As of September, it has received 230 million yuan worth of orders.

In May 2022, Iluvatar CoreX completed the design of the Zhikai-100 series, a 7nm GPGPU used for AI inference purposes.

== See also ==
- Cambricon Technologies
- Enflame
- MetaX
- Semiconductor industry in China
