= Hangzhou Changchuan Technology =

Chinese semiconductor equipment manufacturer

Hangzhou Changchuan Technology Co., Ltd
- Trade name: CCTech
- Native name: 杭州长川科技股份有限公司
- Company type: Public
- Traded as: SZSE: 300604
- Industry: Semiconductors
- Founded: 10 April 2008; 18 years ago
- Founder: Zhao Yi
- Headquarters: Hangzhou, Zhejiang, China
- Key people: Zhao Yi (Chairman & CEO)
- Revenue: ▲CN¥1.78 billion (2023)
- Net income: ▼CN¥60.66 million (2023)
- Total assets: ▲CN¥5.90 billion (2023)
- Total equity: ▲CN¥3.47 billion (2023)
- Number of employees: 3,658 (2023)
- Website: www.hzcctech.com

Hangzhou Changchuan Technology (CCTech; Chinese: 长川科技; pinyin: Chángchuān Kējì) is a publicly listed Chinese company that engages in the development and sale of equipment for testing and measuring semiconductors.

== Background ==
In 2008, Hangzhou Silan Microelectronics (Silan) executive Zhao Yi left with his team to found his own company, CCTech. The company would acquire most of Silan's equipment development department. The name of company came from the birthplace of Zhao and his wife, Xu Xin which were Sichuan and Changxing respectively. His wife took priority hence the name Changchuan. When CCtech first started, Zhao and Xu worked together with one handling the operations and the other handling the finances. The China Integrated Circuit Industry Investment Fund was one of the investors in CCtech.

In October 2015, CCtech looked to go public and changed its business structure which included getting an external hire to manage the finances going forward.

On 17 April 2017, CCtech held its initial public offering becoming a listed company on the Shenzhen Stock Exchange.

In 2019, CCtech acquired Changxin Investment Management which held Semiconductor Technologies & Instruments, a Singaporean automated optical inspection equipment manufacturer that was spun out from Texas Instruments.

In 2023, CCtech acquired Changyi technology which held Exis Tech, a Malaysian company that focuses on back-end semiconductor test handlers.

== Business Operations ==
The relationship between CCtech and Silan was initially very tense. However, later on, Silan gave up the development of testing equipment and turned to acquiring it from CCtech which improved relations. Since both were in Hangzhou and in the same field, the two companies developed a good relationship. Since the beginning, Silan has always been a top five customer of CCtech while CCtech became one of the largest shareholders of Silan.

In 2009, CCtech launched its first digital-analog hybrid tester.

In 2018, CCTech developed China's first fully automatic ultra-precision 12-inch wafer probe station.

CCTech currently is partnered with Chinese semiconductor companies such as Silan, Tongfu Microelectronics, China Resources Microelectronics, and ASE Group.

== See also ==
- Hangzhou Silan Microelectronics
- Beijing Huafeng Test & Control Technology
- Semiconductor industry in China
