= SJ Semiconductor =

Semiconductor company in China

SJ Semiconductor (SJ Semi, SSE: 688220) is a MEOL (Middle-End of Line) foundry founded in 2014, from Jiangyin, Jiangsu province, China, involved in 12-inch bumping and wafer testing.

== History ==
It was founded through a joint venture between Jiangsu Changjiang Electronics Technology Co., Ltd. (JCET) and SMIC. SJ Semiconductor has raised $920M in 3 founding rounds. In October 2021 its valuation was $1,000M. In March 2024 its valuation was $1.8 billion. It has branch offices in Santa Clara, USA and Shanghai, China. It is listed on the U.S. entity list - the company was added in 2020. In October 2024 it was announced a $500,000 fine for GlobalFoundries for shipping chips to SJ Semiconductor (chips valued at over $17 million).

On 21 April 2026, SJ Semiconductor debuted on the Shanghai Stock Exchange in its IPO.

== See also ==
- Semiconductor industry
- Semiconductor industry in China
- List of semiconductor fabrication plants
