= SG Micro =

Chinese Semiconductor Company

SG Micro Corp
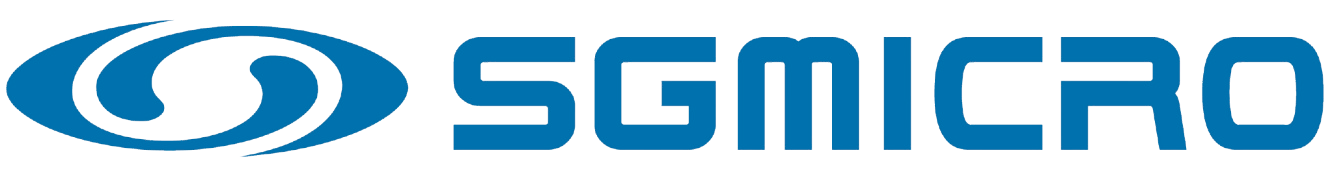
- Trade name: SG Micro
- Native name: 圣邦微电子（北京）股份有限公司
- Company type: Public
- Traded as: SZSE: 300661
- Industry: Semiconductors
- Founded: 2007; 19 years ago
- Founder: Zhang Shilong
- Headquarters: Beijing, China
- Key people: Zhang Shilong (Chairman and CEO)
- Revenue: ▼CN¥2.62 billion (2023)
- Net income: ▼CN¥269.94 million (2023)
- Total assets: ▲CN¥4.71 billion (2023)
- Total equity: ▲CN¥3.84 billion (2023)
- Number of employees: 1,415 (2023)
- Website: www.sg-micro.com

SG Micro (Chinese: 圣邦微电子; pinyin: Shèngbāngwéi Diànzǐ) is a publicly listed Chinese semiconductor company headquartered in Beijing, China. Its main businesses are in analog chips.

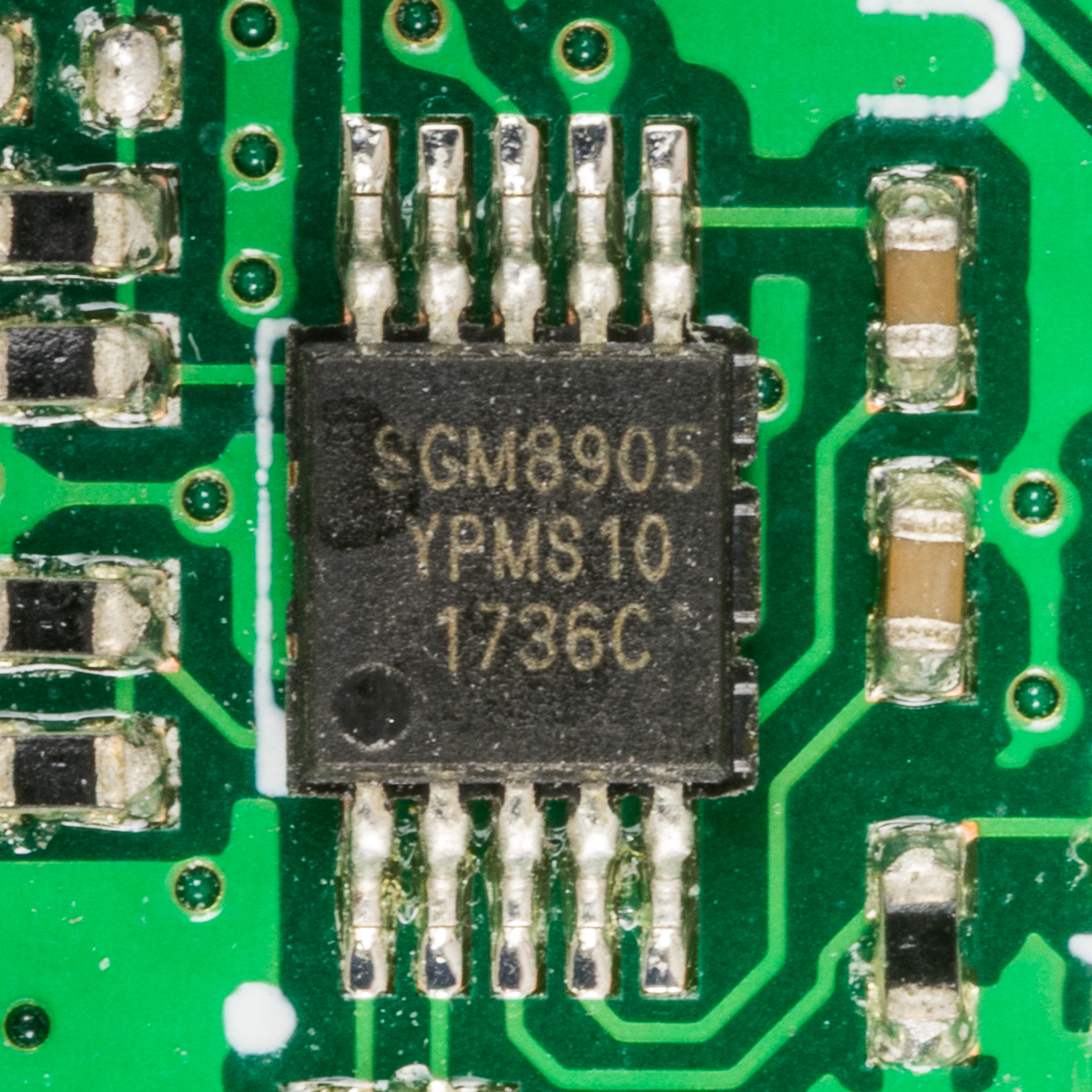
L ine Driver SGM8905

== Background ==
SG Micro was founded in 2007 by Zhang Shilong, a former Texas Instruments employee.

For its first 10 years, SG Micro focused on R&D.

In 2017, SG Micro held its initial public offering becoming a listed company on the Shenzhen Stock Exchange. SG Micro then focused on improving the scale of its business.

In 2018, SG Micro acquired peer company Alpha Analog Technology to expand its local R&D team. In 2019, it also invested in ETA Solutions to improve its position in the local analog chip sector.

In 2021 according to an industry report conducted, SG Micro's Power management integrated circuit products accounted for 30% each of China's handset and non-handset consumer electronics markets while also taking 40% of the industrial market during the year.

In 2022, it was reported that SG Micro's components passed the quality certification for the iPhone 14 Pro models and would become a supplier for Apple's high-end products.

== See also ==
- Semiconductor industry in China
- Texas Instruments
