= Skyverse Technology =

Chinese semiconductor equipment manufacturer

Skyverse Technology Co., Ltd.
- Native name: 深圳中科飞测科技股份有限公司
- Company type: Public; State-owned enterprise
- Traded as: SSE: 688361
- Industry: Semiconductors
- Founded: 31 December 2014; 11 years ago
- Founder: Chen Lu
- Headquarters: Shenzhen, Guangdong, China
- Key people: Chen Lu (Chairman & CEO)
- Revenue: ▲CN¥890.90 million (2023)
- Net income: ▲CN¥140.35 million (2023)
- Total assets: ▲CN¥3.43 billion (2023)
- Total equity: ▲CN¥2.46 billion (2023)
- Number of employees: 875 (2023)
- Website: www.skyverse.cn

Skyverse Technology (Skyverse; Chinese: 中科飞测; pinyin: Zhōngkē Fēicè) is a partially state-owned publicly listed Chinese company that engages in the development and sale of equipment for testing and measuring semiconductors.

== Background ==
In 2010, Chen Lu returned to China from the U.S. after obtaining his doctorate from Brown University and working for Rudolph Technologies and KLA-Tencor. He worked at The Institute of Microelectronics of the Chinese Academy of Sciences where he headed an optical instruments and equipment project.

In 2014, the project was spun-out as the company, Skyverse. Chen and his team from the institute moved from Beijing to Shenzhen to set up the company. Shenzhen was selected as it was a business cluster for semiconductor equipment companies. Investors of the company include Huawei, Shenzhen Capital Group and SDIC Venture Capital.

Partnerships of Skyverse include Semiconductor Manufacturing International Corporation, Yangtze Memory Technologies, Silan Microelectronics, and Tongfu Microelectronics. In 2019, Skyverse started selling its chip semiconductor testing equipment to major Chinese chipmakers partially due to trade tensions with the U.S. It aims to take on KLA Corporation which is the world's biggest semiconductor testing tool provider.

In May 2023, Skyverse held its initial public offering becoming a listed company by listing on the Shanghai Stock Exchange STAR Market.

In December 2024, Skyverse was targeted in a new round of US export controls and added to the United States Department of Commerce's Entity List. Skyverse stated it is not seeing any "significant impact" because it has been preparing for external shocks for the last five years.

== See also ==
- KLA Corporation
- Semiconductor industry in China
