= Enflame =

Chinese artificial intelligence chip manufacturer

Shanghai Enflame Technology Co., Ltd.
- Trade name: Enflame
- Native name: 上海燧原科技股份有限公司
- Type: Public
- Traded as: SSE: 688801
- Industry: Semiconductors
- Founded: 19 March 2018; 8 years ago
- Founders: Zhao Lidong; Zhang Yalin
- Headquarters: Shanghai, China
- Key people: Zhang Yalin (CEO)
- Website: www.enflame-tech.com

Shanghai Enflame Technology Co., Ltd. (Enflame; Chinese: 燧原科技; pinyin: Suìyuán Kējì) is a Chinese technology company headquartered in Shanghai.

The company develops general-purpose computing on graphics processing units (GPGPUs) for use in the field of cloud computing and artificial intelligence (AI). It has been compared to Nvidia due to their similar focus.

== Background ==
Enflame was founded in March 2018 by two former AMD employees. Early on, it received funding from investors such as Tencent and ZhenFund. Other investors include Meitu, Primavera Capital Group, CITIC Private Equity and the China Integrated Circuit Industry Investment Fund.

In October 2018, Enflame purchased multiple licenses of Arteris FlexNoC interconnect for use as the on-chip communications backbone of its AI training chips in cloud data centers.

In June 2024, it was reported that that Enflame submitted downgraded designs of its chips to TSMC in late 2023 to comply with U.S. restrictions. Enflame has been noted to sell its chips to state-owned enterprises and has cooperated with several local governments on projects.

In August 2024, Enflame stated it planned to hold an initial public offering (IPO) on the Shanghai Stock Exchange STAR Market and had hired China International Capital Corporation to advise on the process.

In October 2024, it was reported that Enflame had partnered with government entities in Wuxi to begin construction of an AI computing hub there.

In September 2026, Enflame held its IPO to become a listed company on the Shanghai Stock Exchange.

== See also ==
- Cambricon Technologies
- MetaX
- Semiconductor industry in China
