= Kunlunxin =

Baidu semiconductor subsidiary

Kunlunxin (Beijing) Technology Co Ltd
- Trade name: Kunlunxin
- Native name: 昆仑芯（北京）科技有限公司
- Type: Subsidiary
- Industry: Semiconductors
- Founded: April 2021; 5 years ago
- Headquarters: Beijing, China
- Key people: Ouyang Jian (CEO)
- Parent: Baidu
- Website: www.kunlunxin.com

Kunlunxin (Beijing) Technology Co Ltd (Kunlunxin; Chinese: 昆仑芯; pinyin: Kūnlúnxīn) is the semiconductor subsidiary of Baidu.

== History ==
Baidu started developing its own chips back in 2011.

In April 2021, the chip project was spun off as a separate entity called Kunlunxin with Baidu's chief chip architect becoming its CEO. Baidu remains as its largest shareholder.

== Product history ==
In 2011, Baidu started work on the Kunlun AI chip project. Initially, Baidu researched and emulated its many-small-core XPU microarchitecture using FPGAs, but in 2018 finally built a dedicated silicon that was built using one of Samsung Foundry's 14 nm process. In July 2018, Baidu unveiled the Kunlun AI chip to the public marking its debut. The new design was 30 times faster than the original FPGA-based processor. The chip was deployed in Baidu's search engine.

In August 2021, Kunlunxin unveiled the Kunlun II AI Chip which was comparable to the Nvidia A100. It was introduced to the Ernie Bot deep learning model as well in Baidu robotaxi and Apolong.

In April 2025, at its developer conference, Baidu unveiled a 30,000-chip cluster powered by its third-generation P800 Kunlun chips. Baidu pitched the system as capable of training "DeepSeek-like" models with hundreds of billions of parameters. They would be used to handle the vast majority of the Baidu's inference tasks.

In August 2025, Baidu's AI servers powered by Kunlun chips won the bidding for a centralized procurement project held by China Mobile.

In November 2025, Baidu stated it would release the Kunlun M100 chip in 2026 and the Kunlun M300 chip in 2027.

In December 2025, Kunlunxin reached a valuation of almost US$3 billion. It was reported that there were plans for an initial public offering on the Hong Kong Stock Exchange.

== See also ==
- HiSilicon
- T-Head
- Semiconductor industry in China
