= Goodix =

Chinese Technology Company

Shenzhen Goodix Technology Co., Ltd.
- Trade name: Goodix
- Native name: 深圳市汇顶科技股份有限公司
- Company type: Public
- Traded as: SSE: 603160
- Industry: Semiconductors
- Founded: 2002; 24 years ago
- Founder: Zhang Fan
- Headquarters: Shenzhen, Guangdong, China
- Key people: Zhang Fan (Chairman and CEO)
- Revenue: ▲CN¥4.41 billion (2023)
- Net income: ▲CN¥165.05 million (2023)
- Total assets: ▲CN¥9.73 billion (2023)
- Total equity: ▲CN¥8.05 billion (2023)
- Number of employees: 1,506 (2023)
- Website: www.goodix.com

Goodix Technology (Goodix; Chinese: 汇顶科技; pinyin: Huìdǐng Kējì) is a publicly listed Chinese technology company headquartered in Shenzhen, China. The company is known for developing touchscreen solutions for smartphones.

== Background ==
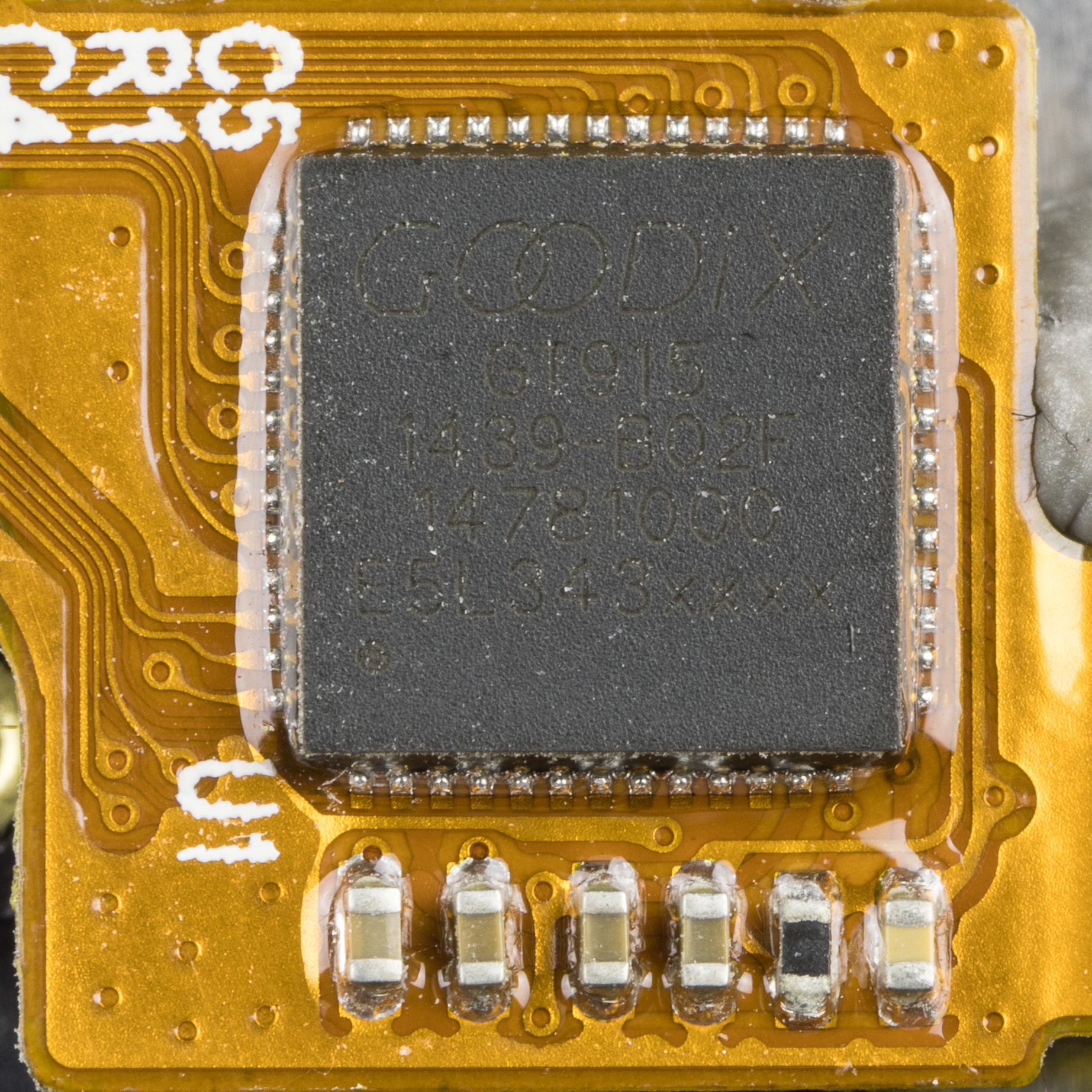
Goodix GT915

In 2002, Goodix was founded by Zhang Fan.

Goodix started its business with communication integrated circuits (ICs) for fixed-line telephones, and then expanded its product reach to touchscreen ICs.

In 2011, MediaTek made a significant investment in Goodix. Goodix leveraged MediaTek's reference-design platform allowing its revenue to exceed the US$100m mark in 2013.

By 2015, Goodix expanded its product line to include fingerprint scanners.

In October 2016, Goodix held its initial public offering becoming a listed company on the Shanghai Stock Exchange. Within a month after listing, it was China's largest chip design company by market capitalization.

In 2019, Goodix acquired a division of Voice and Audio Solutions under NXP Semiconductors.

In August 2020, Goodix acquired Dream Chip Technologies, a German fabless semiconductor company.

In February 2021, British technology company WaveTouch sued Goodix for patent infringement. It alleged that Goodix copied its system designed to improve the accuracy of fingerprint readers underneath smartphone screens.

While initially profitable due to touchscreen and fingerprint scanner products, Goodix experienced a decline in profitability due to increased competition and decrease in smartphone shipments. The company has aimed to diversify its business to IoT and automotive electronics.

== See also ==
- MediaTek
- Semiconductor industry in China
