= Innoscience =

Chinese Semiconductor Company

InnoScience (Suzhou) Technology Holding Co., Ltd.
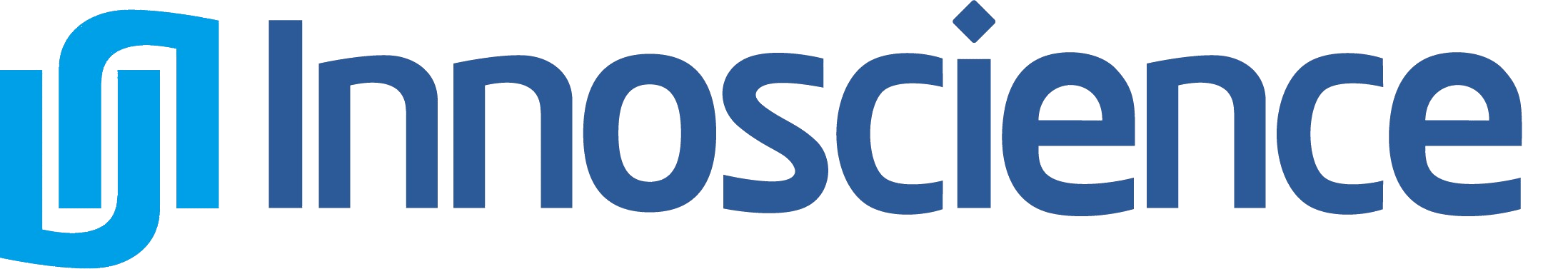
- Trade name: Innoscience
- Native name: 英诺赛科（苏州）科技股份有限公司
- Type: Public
- Traded as: SEHK: 2577
- Industry: Semiconductors
- Founded: 17 December 2015; 10 years ago
- Founders: Luo Weiwei
- Headquarters: Suzhou, Jiangsu, China
- Key people: Luo Weiwei (Chairperson); Wu Jingang (CEO)
- Revenue: ▲CN¥592.72 million (2023)
- Net income: ▲CN¥−1.10 billion (2023)
- Total assets: ▼CN¥4.59 billion (2023)
- Total equity: ▼CN¥1.96 billion (2023)
- Website: www.innoscience.com

InnoScience (Suzhou) Technology Holding Co., Ltd. (Innoscience; Chinese: 英诺赛科; pinyin: Yīngnuò Sàikē) is a publicly listed Chinese semiconductor company headquartered in Suzhou, Jiangsu.

Founded in 2015 by Luo Weiwei, a former NASA scientist, the company is the world's largest integrated device manufacturer that is dedicated on Gallium nitride (GaN) technology, producing 8-inch GaN-on-silicon wafers for applications including chargers, 5G base stations, AI data centers, defense systems, and aerospace. By 2024, Innoscience held a 29.9% share of the global GaN power device market.

== Background ==
Innoscience was founded in 2015 originally in Zhuhai by Luo Weiwei. Luo received her PhD in applied mathematics from Massey University and previously worked as a scientist for NASA for 15 years.

Innoscience became a leading player in the latest generation of microchips made using technology that combines GaN with traditional silicon. Due to heavy R&D spending to boost its production of GaN chips, GaN wafers and GaN modules, Innoscience has so far been unprofitable. The vast majority of its sales are to customers in China.

In early 2022, Innoscience announced it was launching international operations in the US and Europe.

By 2024, Innoscience held a 29.9% share of the global GaN power device market.

On 30 December 2024, Innoscience held its initial public offering (IPO) becoming a listed company on the Hong Kong Stock Exchange. The offering raised HK$1.4 billion giving it a valuation of HK$27 billion.

In August 2025, Innoscience announced a collaboration with Nvidia on an 800VDC power architecture for AI data centers, intended to support higher efficiency and power density in large-scale computing systems.

In December 2025, Onsemi and Innoscience signed a memorandum of understanding to evaluate opportunities to accelerate deployment of GaN power devices, starting with 40-200V, and to broaden customer adoption.

== Lawsuits ==
=== EPC ===
In July 2023, Innoscience was investigated by the United States International Trade Commission (USITC), after an intellectual property complaint was filed by Efficient Power Conversion (EPC) who alleged infringement of four patents. In November 2024, USITC found no infringement on the '508 patent however found an infringement on the '294 patent. Consequently, USITC imposed a limited exclusion order prohibiting importation of certain Innoscience chips that violated EPC's '294 patent which barred them from entering the US market. However, the effect of the ruling was mitigated when Innoscience stated that it had redesigned its products to avoid the ban. Innoscience also stated it will appeal the ruling. According to supply chain sources, Innoscience offers price quotes that are only about half of what other global GaN companies charge, which lead to EPC and Infineon taking proactive measures to prevent a price war coming out of China. InnoScience's low-price strategy would affect two larger groups which are the GaN supply chain companies outside China and domestic competitors within China. Companies would be unable to compete with Innoscience on price and the non-China supply chain could collapse if GaN OEM partners pulled out due to cost. By March 2025, EPC had withdrawn two of the four patents it had asserted, and the USITC had determined that a third patent ('508) was not infringed by Innoscience. Although the commission initially upheld certain claims of a fourth patent ('294), the U.S. Patent and Trademark Office (USPTO) overturned that finding. On 18 March 2025, the Patent Trial and Appeal Board issued its final decision invalidating all asserted claims of the '294 patent, bringing the two-year dispute over four patents to a conclusion in Innoscience's favor.

=== Infineon Technologies ===
On 14 March 2024, Infineon Technologies (Infineon) initiated a patent infringement suit against Innoscience in the United States District Court for the Northern District of California. On 4 June 2024, Infineon filed additional lawsuits against Innoscience's German distributors in the District Court of Munich. On 23 July 2024, Infineon expanded its lawsuit scope in California to include affiliates of Infineon. In January 2025, Innoscience countersued Infineon and its Chinese subsidiaries in the Suzhou Intermediate people's court of Jiangsu Province over alleged infringement of two patents on power chips. On 3 December 2025, Innoscience stated that it had prevailed in its US patent dispute with Infineon.

== See also ==
- Gallium nitride
- Semiconductor industry in China
