= PNC Process Systems =

Chinese semiconductor equipment manufacturer

PNC Process Systems Co., Ltd
- Trade name: PNC
- Native name: 上海至纯洁净系统科技股份有限公司
- Company type: Public
- Traded as: SSE: 603690
- Industry: Semiconductors
- Founded: 13 November 2000; 25 years ago
- Founder: Jiang Yuan
- Headquarters: Shanghai, China
- Key people: Jiang Yuan (Chairman & CEO)
- Revenue: ▲CN¥3.15 billion (2023)
- Net income: ▲CN¥327.97 million (2023)
- Total assets: ▲CN¥11.92 billion (2023)
- Total equity: ▲CN¥5.07 billion (2023)
- Number of employees: 1,811 (2023)
- Website: www.pncs.cn

PNC Process Systems (PNC; Chinese: 至纯科技; pinyin: Zhìchún Kējì) is a publicly listed Chinese company that engages in the development and sale of semiconductor equipment mostly notably in wet cleaning.

== Background ==
PNC was founded in 2000 by Jiang Yuan. She was previously the marketing director at Kinetics Process Systems before leaving with her team to establish PNC.

Although the company initially experienced difficulty, according to Jiang by 2010, the company no longer required any loans or external financing.

In 2017, PNC held its initial public offering becoming a listed company on the Shanghai Stock Exchange. Around this time, PNC established its wet cleaning equipment division which became the focus of the company.

In 2019, PNC acquired optoelectronics firm, Bandweaver Technologies for 680 million yuan.

In December 2023, the United States Department of Commerce's Bureau of Industry and Security added PNC to the Unverified List.

In February 2024, The Korea Times reported four Samsung Electronics employees were arrested in the previous month for sharing the company's latest semiconductor surface cleaning equipment technology with PNC.

Customers of PNC include Samsung, SK Hynix, TSMC, SMIC, Hua Hong Semiconductor, Yangtze Memory Technologies, ChangXin Memory Technologies and Silan Microelectronics.

== See also ==
- ACM Research
- Semiconductor industry in China
