= Beijing Huafeng Test & Control Technology =

Chinese semiconductor equipment manufacturer

Beijing Huafeng Test & Control Technology Co., Ltd.
- Trade name: Accotest
- Native name: 北京华峰测控技术股份有限公司
- Company type: Public
- Traded as: SSE: 688200
- Industry: Semiconductors
- Founded: 1 February 1993; 33 years ago
- Founder: Sun Xian
- Headquarters: Beijing, China
- Key people: Sun Qiang (Chairman); Cai Lin (CEO)
- Revenue: ▼CN¥690.86 million (2023)
- Net income: ▼CN¥251.65 million (2023)
- Total assets: ▲CN¥3.47 billion (2023)
- Total equity: ▲CN¥3.33 billion (2023)
- Number of employees: 608 (2023)
- Website: www.hftc.com.cn

Beijing Huafeng Test & Control Technology (doing business as Accotest; Chinese: 华峰测控; pinyin: Huáfēng Cèkòng) is a publicly listed Chinese company that engages in the development and sale of equipment for testing and measuring semiconductors.

== Background ==
Accotest was founded in 1993 by Sun Xian who had previously worked for the China Aerospace Science and Technology Corporation. It is one of the earliest companies to enter the semiconductor testing equipment industry in China and eventually broke the foreign monopoly over testing analog chips.

In February 2020, Accotest held its initial public offering becoming a listed company on the Shanghai Stock Exchange STAR Market.

On 6 June 2021, Accotest announced its founder Sun Xian died due to illness at the age of 72.

In June 2024, Accotest opened a factory in Penang, Malaysia to further strengthen cooperation with overseas customers.

In December 2024, Accotest was targeted in a new round of US export controls and added to the United States Department of Commerce's Entity List.

== See also ==
- Hangzhou Changchuan Technology
- Semiconductor industry in China
