= Wuhan Jingce Electronic Group =

Chinese electronics company

Wuhan Jingce Electronic Group Co., Ltd.
- Trade name: Jingce
- Native name: 武汉精测电子集团股份有限公司
- Company type: Public
- Traded as: SZSE: 300567
- Industry: Semiconductors; Electronics
- Founded: 20 April 2006; 20 years ago
- Founder: Peng Qian
- Headquarters: Wuhan, Hubei, China
- Key people: Peng Qian (Chairman & CEO)
- Revenue: ▼CN¥2.43 billion (2023)
- Net income: ▲CN¥89.47 million (2023)
- Total assets: ▲CN¥9.22 billion (2023)
- Total equity: ▲CN¥4.22 billion (2023)
- Number of employees: 2,979 (2023)
- Website: www.wuhanjingce.com

Wuhan Jingce Electronic Group (Jingce; Chinese: 精测电子; pinyin: Jīngcè Diànzǐ) is a publicly listed Chinese electronics company. It engages in the development and sale of semiconductor testing equipment, flat-panel detectors and new energy battery systems.

== Background ==
Jingce was founded in April 2006 by Peng Qian. Peng accidentally discovered during a business trip that graph signal generators, a key component of flat-panel displays were monopolized by Japanese and Korean manufacturers leading to expensive prices. As a result, Jingce focused initially on developing domestic graph signal generators and flat-panel detector related items.

On 22 November 2016, Jingce held its initial public offering becoming a listed company on the Shenzhen Stock Exchange.

In 2018, Jingce expanded its business lines by entering the semiconductor and new energy fields. As a result, Jingce currently has partnerships with a significant amount of Chinese domestic companies.

In August 2019, Jingce acquired a 61% stake in Wintest, a listed Japanese chip testing company.

In September 2024, Jingce formed a consortium with an investment fund of China Mobile to acquire a 41.93% stake in semiconductor firm Jiangsu Xinsheng Intelligent Technology from the China Integrated Circuit Industry Investment Fund.

In December 2024, Jingce was targeted in a new round of US export controls and added to the United States Department of Commerce's Entity List.
