= Hwatsing Technology =

Chinese semiconductor equipment manufacturer

Hwatsing Technology Co., Ltd.
- Native name: 华海清科股份有限公司
- Company type: Public; State-owned enterprise
- Traded as: SSE: 688120
- Industry: Semiconductors
- Founded: 10 April 2013; 13 years ago
- Founders: Luo Jianbin; Lu Xinchun
- Headquarters: Tianjin, China
- Key people: Lu Xinchun (Chairman); Zhang Guoming (CEO)
- Revenue: ▲CN¥2.51 billion (2023)
- Net income: ▲CN¥723.75 million (2023)
- Total assets: ▲CN¥9.12 billion (2023)
- Total equity: ▲CN¥5.52 billion (2023)
- Owner: Tsinghua Holdings (28.19%)
- Number of employees: 1,268 (2023)
- Website: www.hwatsing.com

Hwatsing Technology (Hwatsing; Chinese: 华海清科; pinyin: Huáhǎi Qīngkē) is a partially state-owned publicly listed Chinese company headquartered in Tianjin that manufactures semiconductor chip production equipment.

Its most notable product offerings are in chemical-mechanical polishing (CMP) machines.

== Background ==
In 2000 at Tsinghua University, Luo Jianbin and Lu Xinchun began their research on CMP technology.

In April 2013, Tsinghua Holdings and the Tianjin Municipal Government established Hwatsing to commercialize the technology developed from the CMP project. Hwatsing produced China's first 12-inch CMP machine.

On 9 June 2022, Hwatsing held its initial public offering becoming a listed company after listing on the Shanghai Stock Exchange STAR Market. The offering raised $540 million and the shares rose 64% on its trading debut.

In August 2024, it was reported that Hwatsing would invest $237.2 million to build a new plant in Shanghai.

In December 2024, Hwatsing was targeted in a new round of US export controls and added to the United States Department of Commerce's Entity List.

== Business operations ==
Hwatsing's main product offerings are CMP machines. It has also expanded into other business lines such as grinders and wafer regeneration.

Hwatsing has been touted to break the monopoly of Applied Materials in China. Clients of Hwatsing include Semiconductor Manufacturing International Corporation, Hua Hong Semiconductor and Yangtze Memory Technologies.

== See also ==
- Chemical-mechanical polishing
- Tsinghua Holdings
- Semiconductor industry in China
