= China Resources Microelectronics =

Chinese Semiconductor Company

China Resources Microelectronics Limited
- Trade name: CR Micro
- Native name: 华润微电子有限公司
- Formerly: CSMC Technologies
- Type: Public; State-owned enterprise
- Traded as: SSE: 688396
- Industry: Semiconductors
- Predecessor: Wuxi Huajing Electronics
- Founded: 28 January 2003; 23 years ago
- Headquarters: Wuxi, Jiangsu, China
- Key people: Chen Xiaojun (chairman); Li Hong (CEO)
- Revenue: ▼CN¥9.90 billion (2023)
- Net income: ▼CN¥1.44 billion (2023)
- Total assets: ▲CN¥29.22 billion (2023)
- Total equity: ▲CN¥23.63 billion (2023)
- Number of employees: 10,249 (2023)
- Parent: China Resources
- Website: www.crmicro.com

China Resources Microelectronics (CR Micro; Chinese: 华润微; pinyin: Huárùn Wēi) is a partially state-owned publicly listed Chinese semiconductor company headquartered in Wuxi, Jiangsu. It is the largest integrated device manufacturer in China.

CR Micro is a subsidiary of China Resources.

== Background ==
The origins of CR Micro can be traced to Wuxi Huajing Electronics, a state-owned semiconductor plan in Wuxi. In September 2002 it was acquired by China Resources and transferred to its subsidiary, China Resources Logic (now China Resources Gas). It was renamed to Wuxi China Resources Microelectronics.

In May 2006, China Resources Logic became the controlling shareholder of CSMC Technologies, another semiconductor company that was listed on the Hong Kong Stock Exchange with the ticker '597'. In November 2007, China Resources Logic sold its entire semiconductor business to CSMC Technologies. This was to consolidate the semiconductor business. In March 2008, CSMC Technologies changed its name to CR Micro.

In July 2011, it was reported that China Resources was considering taking CR Micro private via buyout. Later that year, it delisted from the Hong Kong Stock Exchange.

In February 2020, CR Micro listed on the Shanghai Stock Exchange STAR Market making it the first Red chip company to be listed on the Shanghai Stock Exchange.

In August 2023, CR Micro approved a plan for its Shenzhen subsidiary, Runpeng Semiconductors to sell shares to several investors such as the China Integrated Circuit Industry Investment Fund. The aim was to build a 12-inch wafer foundry in Shenzhen.

In March 2024, CR Micro acquired a 22.5% stake in JCET making it the controlling shareholder.

== See also ==
- China Resources
- JCET
- Semiconductor industry in China
