= Shanghai Wanye Enterprises =

Chinese semiconductor and real estate company

Shanghai Wanye Enterprises Co., Ltd
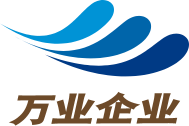
- Trade name: SWEC
- Native name: 上海万业企业股份有限公司
- Formerly: Shanghai Zhong Cheng Industrial; COSCO Development
- Company type: Public
- Traded as: SSE: 600641
- Industry: Semiconductors; Real estate
- Founded: 28 October 1991; 34 years ago
- Headquarters: Shanghai, China
- Key people: Zhu Xudong (Chairman); Wang Xiaobo
- Revenue: ▼CN¥964.61 million (2023)
- Net income: ▼CN¥83.89 million (2023)
- Total assets: ▲CN¥10.59 billion (2023)
- Total equity: ▲CN¥8.81 billion (2023)
- Number of employees: 618 (2023)
- Subsidiaries: Kingstone Semiconductor; Joysingtech; Compart Systems
- Website: www.wanye.com.cn

Shanghai Wanye Enterprises (SWEC; Chinese: 万业企业; pinyin: Wànyè Qǐyè) is a publicly listed Chinese company that engages in the development and sale of semiconductor equipment. It also engages in the sale of real estate properties.

Its three semiconductor subsidiaries are Kingstone Semiconductor, Compart Systems and Joysingtech.

== Background ==
The company was established in October 1991 as Shanghai Zhong Cheng Industrial, a real estate company.

On 7 April 1993, the company went public by listing on the Shanghai Stock Exchange.

In July 1997, COSCO acquired a controlling stake in Shanghai Zhong Cheng Industrial. The company was subsequently renamed to COSCO Development.

In 2006, Salim Group acquired a controlling stake in COSCO Development and the company was renamed to Shanghai Wanye Enterprises.

Due to the sluggish real estate market, Salim Group looked to transform SWEC into a semiconductor company by acquiring overseas firms although the initial plan did not materialize. In November 2015, the Shanghai Pudong Science and Technology Investment Company became the largest shareholder of SWEC after a share transfer agreement with Salim Group. Under the new ownership structure, SWEC continued its transformation into a semiconductor company.

In April 2017, SWEC took the lead in launching the Shanghai Semiconductor Equipment and Material Investment Fund where it became it became the joint largest shareholder along with the China Integrated Circuit Industry Investment Fund.

In 2022, it was reported that SWEC's main revenue and profit still came from the sale of existing real estate holdings and that the company still had not transformed fully into a semiconductor company.

== Subsidiaries ==
=== Kingstone Semiconductor ===
In July 2018, SWEC acquired Kingstone Semiconductor. It is a Chinese supplier of ion implanters and is also capable of providing low-energy ion implanters for the 28 nm process.

In December 2024, Kingstone Semiconductor was targeted in a new round of US export controls and added to the United States Department of Commerce's Entity List.

=== Compart Systems ===
In December 2020, SWEC acquired Compart Systems from Platinum Equity. Headquarter in Singapore, it is a supplier of component fittings for semiconductors.

=== Joysingtech ===
In December 2021, SWEC established Joysingtech which would focus on developing semiconductor equipment. SMIC founder Zhang Rujing was noted to be involved. In 2023, BYD became an investor in it.

== See also ==
- COSCO
- Salim Group
- Semiconductor industry in China
