= Advanced Linear Devices =

American semiconductor company

- Industry: Semiconductor
- Founded: 1985
- Founder: Robert Chao
- Headquarters: Sunnyvale, California
- Products: CMOS, MOSFET, integrated circuits
- Website: https://www.aldinc.com

Advanced Linear Devices Incorporated, also known as ALD, is a semiconductor device design and manufacturing company based in Sunnyvale, California. The company develops and manufactures precision analog CMOS linear integrated circuits for industrial controls, instrumentation, computers, medical devices, automotive, and telecommunications products. It is best known for its redesign of the 555 timer IC as a low-voltage CMOS device.

The company provides MOSFET arrays, including proprietary designs with zero voltage thresholds. They also produce and operational amplifiers, analog voltage comparators used in electronic systems as current sources and voltage references.

== History ==
ALD was founded in 1985 by Robert Chao, who hired engineers and scientists from semiconductor design, technology and manufacturing backgrounds. He developed many new analog semiconductor products, particularly voltage comparators MOSFETs, and energy harvesting devices.

Other products developed at ALD are rail-to-rail operational amplifiers, function-specific ASIC (application-specific integrated circuits), low charge injection analog switches, timers and on-chip electronic trimming.

=== Technology ===
ALD technology development focuses on improving the precision of CMOS linear integrated circuits to reduce power consumption, improve energy efficiency, increase sensitivity or expand the operating range of electronic systems. ALD three main contributions to the advancement CMOS linear integrated circuit design are called electrically programmable analog device or EPAD; energy harvesting; and supercapacitor auto-balancing or SAB.

==== EPAD ====
EPAD is technique ALD devised for CMOS devices to cut the wasted energy of current and voltage leakage by enabling finely-tuned control of specific parameters such as gate threshold voltage.

ALD optimizes the metal-oxide-semiconductor field-effect transistor, or MOSFET, which can be used to build low-voltage, low-power, high-precision linear circuits on a printed circuit board. Over time, ALD has continuously refined the use of gate trimming to deliver more precision parameters. Devices shaved this way makes it possible to implement circuits that consume as little as 0.1-volt in MOSFETs, or several orders of magnitude below previous devices.

EPAD involves the trimming of a CMOS transistor to create electrically programmable analog devices with a floating gate of polysilicon embedded in the device gate oxide. Gate trimming is performed by injecting a charge of "hot" electrons with sufficient energy to enter the oxide through the floating gate structure. Once programmed, the set voltage and current levels are stored indefinitely inside the device.

MOSFETs with gate trimming can be programmed individually or in differential pairs. When programmed in differential pairs, one channel can be programmed to activate a particular condition, thus providing bi-directional control capability which enables a high degree of flexibility in the design of logic and functions.

==== Supercapacitor auto-balancing ====
Supercapacitors are an emerging technology used for energy storage in growing numbers of electronic circuit board applications. However, it is often necessary to combine individual supercapacitors a series to store and discharge a level of useful amounts such as five volts.

Over time, supercapacitors cells designed in parallel create overvoltage, which can damage each cell and cause the energy storage application to fail. Therefore, all supercapacitors must be balanced with additional devices and circuits to balance to prevent overvoltage.

ALD designed an EPAD MOSFET array to automatically balance each supercapacitor cell in a series by utilizing the leakage current of each cell. The advantage here is to provide a superior alternative to traditional balancing techniques using operational amplifiers or resistors by minimizing device count, board space, and energy consumption.

ALD used a simple principle to offer auto balancing by utilizing the natural threshold characteristics of MOSFET devices to control the voltage at which a MOSFET turns on and starts to conduct a current. The combined SAB MOSFET and a supercapacitor array can self-regulate with various array leakage mismatches and environmental temperature changes. MOSFET arrays are then incorporated into printed circuit boards to produce supercapacitor auto balancing modules to accelerate design integration.

==== Energy harvesting ====
Energy harvesting (EH) is the process of capturing and accumulating energy from a faint or intermittent energy source, storing the energy for a period, and then conditioning the power to operate an application such as remote, low power microprocessor–based sensing system.

ALD offers devices with the precision parameters to enable the harvesting of faint energy sources and the efficient accumulation, storage and discharge of usable power for electronic systems.

Energy harvesting allows the capture of residual energy that occurs as a by-product of a natural environmental phenomenon such as releases from industrial processes. Previously, residual energy was not sufficient in quantity or frequency to be captured, stored and discharged in a usable form. Target energy harvesting sources are mechanical energy resulting from vibration, stress, and strain; thermal from furnaces and other heating sources; solar from light sources; electromagnetic captured via inductors, coils and transformers; wind and fluid energy resulting from air and liquid flow; and chemical energy from naturally recurring biological processes.

ALD has specialized in energy harvesting devices and circuits that can finally provide the overall energy management to provide a useful output and to make these sources viable for ultra-low power applications, such as wireless sensor nodes. Using EPAD technology, ALD designed devices with a high degree of sensitivity to stay in the active mode and be ready to perform the energy capture function whenever a trace or residual source starts to generate.

To capture and accumulate these small energy packets, ALD designed high energy retention methods to store the energy for long periods of time, and the micro signal conditioning to perform the mission. Precision parameters such as a 0.0-volt gate threshold, allow the circuit to remain on so that energy collection could start immediately above 0.0V. ALD devices also tolerate a wide range of voltage, current, and waveform inputs, including over-voltage, over-charge, and other irregular input conditions.

== Awards ==
- Electronic Products 30th Annual Product of the Year Awards
- Electronic Products 32nd Annual Product of the Year Awards
