= Huatian Technology =

Chinese Semiconductor Company

Tianshui Huatian Technology Co., Ltd.
- Native name: 天水华天科技股份有限公司
- Company type: Public
- Traded as: SZSE: 002185
- Industry: Semiconductors
- Predecessor: Yonghong Appliance Factory
- Founded: 25 December 2003; 22 years ago
- Founder: Xiao Shengli
- Headquarters: Tianshui, Gansu, China
- Key people: Xiao Shengli (Chairman); Cui Weibing (CEO)
- Revenue: ▼CN¥11.30 billion (2023)
- Net income: ▼CN¥278.10 million (2023)
- Total assets: ▲CN¥33.75 billion (2023)
- Total equity: ▼CN¥19.12 billion (2023)
- Number of employees: 26,427 (2023)
- Subsidiaries: Flipchip; Unisem
- Website: www.ht-tech.com

Huatian Technology (HT-Tech; Chinese: 华天科技; pinyin: Huátiān Kējì) is a publicly listed Chinese semiconductor company headquartered in Tianshui, Gansu.

It is one of the largest Outsourced Semiconductor Assembly and Test (OSAT) companies in mainland China. It has a focus on developing advanced packaging technologies such as SiP, TSV, Fan-Out and WLP.

== Background ==
The origins of HT-Tech can be traced to Yonghong Appliance Factory (Factory 749) a state-owned enterprise established in 1969 in Qin'an County to produce integrated circuits. After the reform and opening up, it relocated to Tianshui City in 1994. At this point the factory was in financial distress due to lack of competitiveness and had not paid its employees in months. Long-term factory employee Xiao Shengli was appointed as the factory's director and worked towards reforming it. The factory underwent a significant restructuring with many employees being laid off including Xiao's own family members. In 1998, the factory made a profit after many years of losses.

In December 2003, the factory was transformed into a company named HT-Tech.

On 20 November 2007, HT-Tech held its initial public offering becoming a listed company on the Shenzhen Stock Exchange.

In 2019 HT-Tech acquired Flipchip, an American OSAT company based in Phoenix, Arizona.

In 2019 HT-Tech acquired Unisem, a Malaysian OSAT company to expand in the ASEAN region.

In July 2020, HT-Tech launch an advanced packaging project in Nanjing that would build facilities. The second phase of the projected started in September 2024.

HT-Tech has contributed to many government projects which included the Long March 2F, Fengyun 1, Chang'e 3, Tiangong-1 and the Shenzhou series.

== See also ==
- JCET
- Tongfu Microelectronics
- Semiconductor industry in China
