= Kremny EL =

Russian microelectronics manufacturer

Coordinates: 53.2512°N 34.3311°E

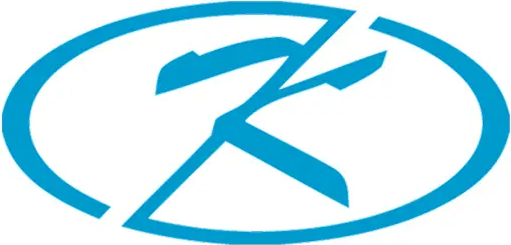
- Founded: 1958; 68 years ago
- Headquarters: Bryansk, Russia
- Products: Microelectronics

JSC Gruppa Kremny EL (Russian: Кремний ЭЛ) also known as Kremniy EL or Silicon EL, is a Russian microelectronics manufacturer. Its products are used in the construction of Russian missile systems. It is currently the subject of sanctions due to the Russian-Ukrainian War.

== History ==
Logo of the Bryansk Semiconductor Factory

Kremny EL was founded in 1958 as the Bryansk Semiconductor Factory, at which time Russia was part of the Soviet Union. The company was restructured into a private company after the collapse of the Soviet Union.

The EU has described it as the second-largest microelectronics supplier in Russia. As of 2024, the company was a supplier of components to the Russian military, including electronic parts for the Iskander ballistic missile, and has also worked on phased-array radar for the Russian military.

== March 2026 attack ==
In March 2026, Ukrainian forces used British Storm Shadow missiles to attack a Kremny EL facility in the Bryansk region, severely damaging it. Russian sources described the attack as an attack on civilians, stating that there were 48 casualties, with 6 dead and 42 injured. According to Ukrainian media, the attack has halted production at the plant.
