= PVA TePla =

PVA TePla AG
- Trade name: PVA TePla AG
- Type: AG (Public limited company)
- ISIN: DE0007461006
- Founded: 2002, Germany
- Headquarters: Wettenberg, Hesse, Germany
- Area served: Worldwide
- Subsidiaries: PVA TePla OKOS; PVA TePla Industrial Vacuum Systems; PVA TePla Scanning Acoustic Microscopy; PVA TePla Metrology & Plasma Solutions; PVA TePla Crystal Growing Systems GmbH; PVA TePla Vacuum Processing Service
- Website: www.pvatepla.com

PVA TePla AG is a German worldwide system engineering company, providing solutions for materials and measurement technology.

== Company ==
PVA TePla acquired Munich Metrology GmbH in 2012, JenaWave GmbH in 2013, OKOS in November 2020 and DIVE imaging systems GmbH in May 2025.

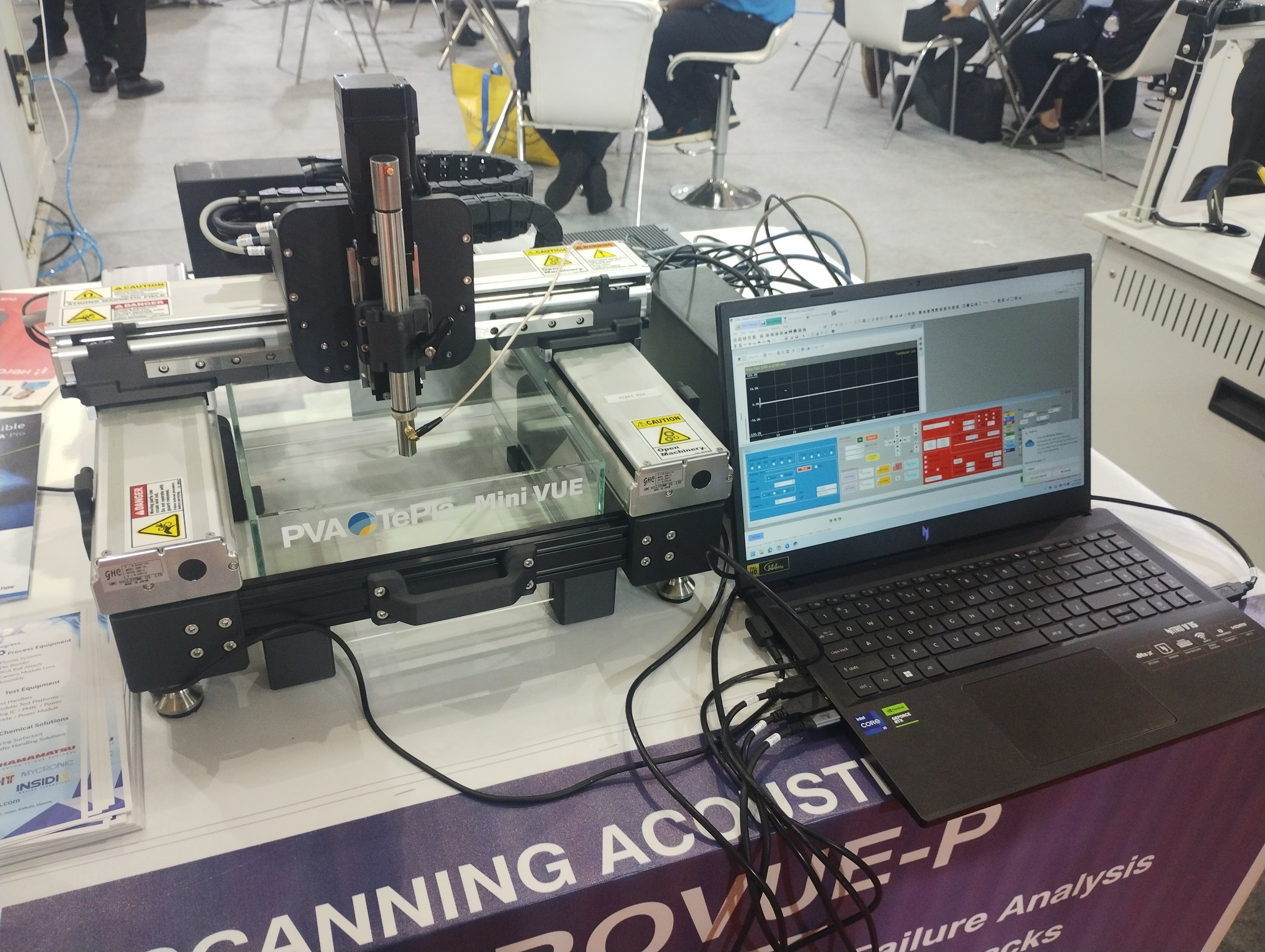
PVA TePla Mini VUE OKOS Digital Imaging System (ODIS) at Electronica 2025, BIEC
