= SurplusGlobal =

South Korean semiconductor company

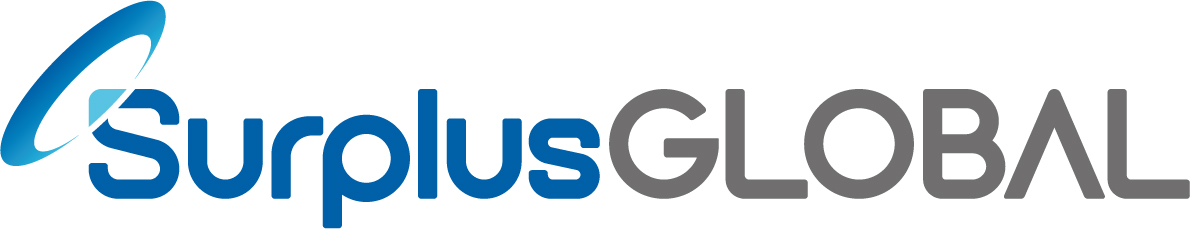
- Native name: 서플러스글로벌
- Type: Public
- Traded as: KRX: 140070
- Industry: Semiconductors
- Founded: 2000
- Founder: Bruce Kim
- Headquarters: Yongin, South Korea
- Subsidiaries: EQ Global
- Website: surplusglobal.com

SurplusGlobal, Inc. (Korean: 서플러스글로벌) is a South Korean company engaged in the trading of used semiconductor manufacturing equipment and parts. Founded in 2000, the company’s business includes the acquisition and sale of used semiconductor equipment and parts, remarketing, refurbishment, logistics, and warehousing services.

== History ==
SurplusGlobal was founded on March 28, 2000, by Bruce Kim (Korean: 김정웅). The company initially focused on used semiconductor equipment trading and later added related services, including refurbishment, logistics, and warehousing.

In 2017, SurplusGlobal acquired EQ Bestech, now known as EQ Global. In the same year, the company was listed on the KOSDAQ market.

In 2022, SurplusGlobal completed a semiconductor equipment cluster in Namsa-eup, Cheoin-gu, Yongin, South Korea. The facility includes areas for used semiconductor equipment distribution, cleanroom operations, testing, and refurbishment.

In 2025, SurplusGlobal launched SemiMarket, an online marketplace for semiconductor equipment and parts.

== Business areas ==
SurplusGlobal’s main business is the trading and remarketing of used semiconductor manufacturing equipment and parts. Its services include equipment sourcing, sales, refurbishment, logistics, and warehousing.

The company also operates SemiMarket, a marketplace platform for semiconductor equipment and parts.

== Subsidiary ==
EQ Global is a subsidiary of SurplusGlobal involved in the repair and refurbishment of semiconductor equipment parts.
