= Hubei Dinglong =

Chinese materials company

Hubei Dinglong Co., Ltd
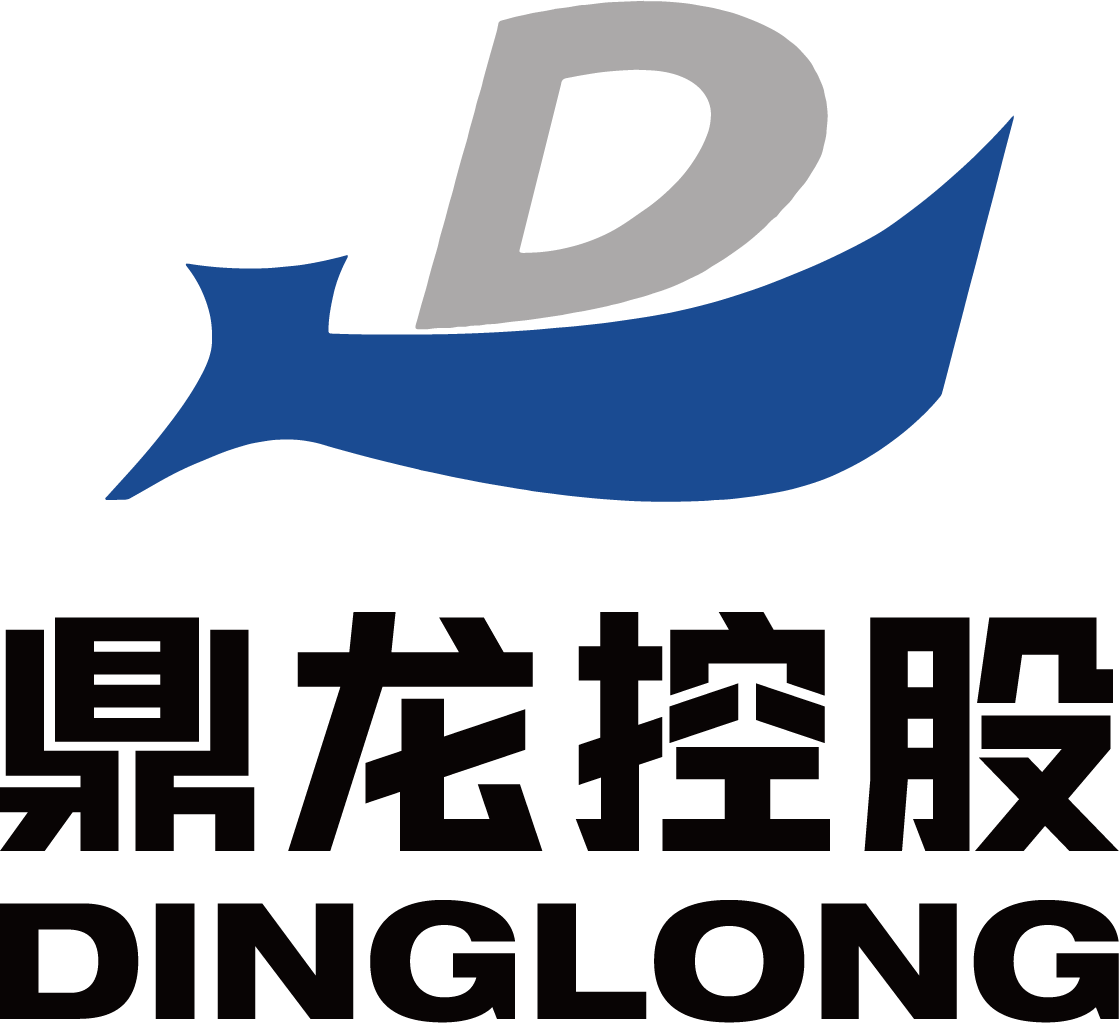
- Trade name: Dinglong
- Native name: 湖北鼎龙控股股份有限公司
- Type: Public
- Traded as: SZSE: 300054
- Industry: Advanced materials Chemicals; Printers
- Founded: 2000; 26 years ago
- Founders: Zhu Shuangquan; Zhu Shunquan
- Headquarters: Wuhan, Hubei, China
- Key people: Zhu Shuangquan (Chairman); Zhu Shunquan (CEO)
- Revenue: ▲CN¥3.34 billion (2024)
- Net income: ▲CN¥638.80 million (2024)
- Total assets: ▲CN¥7.40 billion (2024)
- Total equity: ▼CN¥4.88 billion (2024)
- Number of employees: 3,734 (2024)
- Website: www.dl-kg.com

Hubei Dinglong Co., Ltd (Dinglong; Chinese: 湖北鼎龙; pinyin: Húběi Dǐnglóng) is a publicly listed Chinese advanced materials and printer supplier company headquartered in Wuhan, Hubei. The company focuses on producing semiconductor materials as well as general supplies for printing and copying.

== History ==
In 2000, Dinglong was founded by brothers Zhu Shuangquan and Zhu Shunquan after leaving their jobs at a Hubei state-owned enterprise.

When Dinglong was established, Shunquan who had previous experience as department manager at a Wuhan chemical company served as the supervisor its chemical and materials business. He later became CEO of Dinglong in 2008.

In 2010, Dinglong held its initial public offering and became a listed company on the Shenzhen stock Exchange.

As early as 2012, Dinglong began focusing on the semiconductor materials business. Each year, 12% of its total revenue went to research and development.

In December 2023, Dinglong announced plans plans to invest ¥804 million to build a factory in Qianjiang that makes KrF and ArF photoresists which are crucial light-sensitive materials needed in the production of advanced integrated circuit chips. In December 2024, Dinglong announced that its KrF and ArF photoresists passed customer evaluations and received orders from two domestic wafer manufacturers, totaling over ¥1 million. It achieved this by customizing monomer and resin structures and enhancing processes like purification and mixing, which enabled a fully localized production process covering both materials and final products.

In April 2025, Dinglong announced its CMP pads have been supplied in small batches to a manufacturer.
