= United Nova Technology =

Chinese Semiconductor Company

United Nova Technology Co., Ltd.
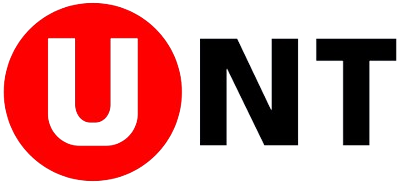
- Trade name: UNT
- Native name: 芯联集成电路制造股份有限公司
- Formerly: Semiconductor Manufacturing Electronics (Shaoxing) Corporation
- Company type: Public; State-owned enterprise
- Traded as: SSE: 688469
- Industry: Semiconductors
- Founded: 9 March 2018; 8 years ago
- Headquarters: Shaoxing, Zhejiang, China
- Key people: Ding Guoxing (Chairman); Zhao Qi (CEO)
- Revenue: ▲CN¥5.32 billion (2023)
- Net income: ▼CN¥−2.94 billion (2023)
- Total assets: ▲CN¥31.57 billion (2023)
- Total equity: ▲CN¥15.85 billion (2023)
- Owner: SMIC (14.10%)
- Number of employees: 4,324 (2023)
- Website: www.unt-c.com

United Nova Technology (UNT; Chinese: 芯联集成; pinyin: Xīnlián Jíchéng) is a partially state-owned publicly listed Chinese semiconductor company headquartered in Shaoxing, Zhejiang. It provides wafer foundry and module packaging solutions.

== Background ==
On 9 March 2018, the company was founded as a joint venture between Semiconductor Manufacturing International Corporation (SMIC) and the government of Shaoxing. It went by the name Semiconductor Manufacturing Electronics (Shaoxing) Corporation or SMEC.

On 10 May 2023, SMEC helds its initial public offering (IPO) by becoming a listed company on the Shanghai Stock Exchange STAR Market. The IPO raised 10 billion yuan (US$1.4 billion) making it one of the largest offerings in 2023.

By the end of 2023 it had become China largest foundry as well as the world's fifth largest in terms of MEMS.

In November 2023, the company was rebranded to United Nova Technology.

In January 2024, UNT announced it signed an agreement today with Nio for the production of silicon carbide modules.

== Financial performance ==
UNT so far has not made a net profit and as of April 2024 has seen its share price drop below IPO levels which has attracted criticism. UNT predicted in the worst-case scenario where SMIC terminates its licensed technology agreement with UNT, the company would achieve profitability in 2025. However its 2023 annual report unveiled that net profit losses were twice the amount that was initially predicted. Institutions such as CITIC Securities still believe UNT will be loss-making in 2025.

The quality of the disclosures in UNT's reporting have also been questioned. UNT has stated it adopts an accelerated depreciation policy which has a greater impact on cost that affects its profit but its annual report showed a straight-line depreciation method being used instead. In addition figures related to items such as investment projects, non-operating expenses and patents were found under scrutiny to be nonsensical.

== See also ==
- Semiconductor Manufacturing International Corporation
- Semiconductor industry in China
