= Maxscend Microelectronics =

Chinese RF Chip Company

Maxscend Microelectronics Company Limited
- Trade name: Maxscend
- Native name: 江苏卓胜微电子股份有限公司
- Company type: Public
- Traded as: SZSE: 300782
- Industry: Semiconductors
- Founded: April 2006; 20 years ago
- Headquarters: Wuxi, Jiangsu, China
- Key people: Xu Zhihan (Chairman & CEO)
- Revenue: ▲CN¥4.38 billion (2023)
- Net income: ▲CN¥1.12 billion (2023)
- Total assets: ▲CN¥10.96 billion (2023)
- Total equity: ▲CN¥9.80 billion (2023)
- Number of employees: 1,703 (2023)
- Website: www.maxscend.com

Maxscend Microelectronics (Maxscend; Chinese: 卓胜微; pinyin: Zhuōshèngwéi) is a publicly listed Chinese semiconductor design company that manufactures integrated circuits in the field of radio frequency (RF). It focuses on RF front end design for RF switches, RF low-noise amplifiers and RF filters.

== Background ==
Maxscend was founded in 2006 by several Silicon Valley employees who returned to China to develop mobile television chips. The popularity of them peaked during the 2008 Summer Olympics. However, due to the development of smartphones, there was a demand for more intelligent chips and the market networks were moving to 4G. The company transformed to meet this new strategy and in 2012 restructured to become a joint-stock company.

Maxscend focused on research and development to come up with new products as its initial funding had dried up and there was no demand for its existing products. Using TSMC's latest RF CMOS process, Maxscend was able to launch its first RF low-noise amplifier in 2013. After this, RF front end became the main focus of the company.

Maxscend entered the supply chain for smartphone companies that are Android OEMs. Its biggest customer is Samsung while it also serves Xiaomi, Vivo Huawei and Oppo.

On 18 June 2019, Maxscend held its initial public offering becoming a listed company on the ChiNext section of the Shenzhen Stock Exchange.

In 2022, Maxscend started trial production of surface acoustic wave (SAW) filters.

In June 2023, shares of Maxscend fell after its deputy General Manager, Tang Zhuang transferred CNY 3.4 billion (US$472.6 million) of shares to his wife as part of a divorce settlement.With a stake of over 5%, his wife became an official shareholder but renounced her rights such as voting.

In December 2023, it was noted that the Huawei Mate 60 used RF switches supplied by Maxscend.

== See also ==
- Semiconductor industry in China
