= Yuanjie Semiconductor Technology =

Chinese chip company

Yuanjie Semiconductor Technology Co., Ltd.
- Trade name: Yuanjie
- Native name: 陕西源杰半导体科技股份有限公司
- Company type: Public
- Traded as: SSE: 688498
- Industry: Semiconductors
- Founded: January 28, 2013; 13 years ago
- Founder: Zhang Xingang
- Headquarters: Shaanxi, China
- Key people: Zhang Xingang (Chairman)
- Revenue: ▲CN¥601.44 million (2025)
- Net income: ▲CN¥190.92 million (2024)
- Total assets: ▲CN¥2.59 billion (2025)
- Total equity: ▲CN¥2.33 billion (2025)
- Number of employees: 716 (2025)
- Website: www.yj-semitech.com

Yuanjie Semiconductor Technology Co., Ltd. (Yuanjie; Chinese: 源杰科技; pinyin: Yuánjié Kējì) is a publicly listed Chinese company that engages in the provision of laser chips for optical communications.

== Background ==
Yuanjie was founded in 2013 by Zhang Xingang, a Tsinghua University graduate who completed graduate studies at the University of Southern California and had worked at Luminent and Source Photonics in the U.S. before returning to China.

In 2020, Huawei made a strategic investment in Yuanjie and entered its supply chain.

In January 2022, Yuanjie submitted an application to go public on the Shanghai Stock Exchange STAR Market. Yuanjie later completed its initial public offering that year becoming a listed compamy.

In 2025, Yuanjie was a beneficiary of artificial intelligence infrastructure trends reporting a significant increase in revenue that year.

In March 2026, Yuanjie applied for a secondary listing on the Hong Kong Stock Exchange. In April 2026, Yuanjie surpassed Kweichow Moutai to become the highest-priced stock listed in mainland China.
