= MetaX =

Chinese artificial intelligence chip manufacturer

MetaX Integrated Circuits (Shanghai) Co., Ltd
- Trade name: MetaX
- Native name: 沐曦集成电路（上海）有限公司
- Type: Public
- Traded as: SSE: 688802
- Industry: GPUs
- Founded: 14 September 2020; 6 years ago
- Founders: Chen Weiliang; Peng Li; Yang Jian
- Headquarters: Shanghai, China
- Key people: Chen Weiliang (CEO)
- Website: www.metax-tech.com

MetaX Integrated Circuits (Shanghai) Co., Ltd (MetaX; Chinese: 沐曦; pinyin: Mùxī) is a Chinese technology company headquartered in Shanghai.

The company develops general-purpose computing on graphics processing units (GPGPUs) for use in the field of artificial intelligence (AI). It has been compared to Nvidia due to their similar focus.

== Background ==
On 14 September 2020, MetaX was founded by former AMD employees.

MetaX has received funding from government entities such as the China Structural Reform Fund and China Internet Investment Fund as well as private entities such as Lightspeed Venture Partners, Sequoia China and Matrix Partners China and Oriental Fortune Capital.

In 2024, MetaX filed more than 210 patent applications, securing over 120 approvals, with 97% of granted patents being inventions.

In January 2025, it was reported that MetaX had filed for an initial public offering (IPO) and hired Huatai Securities to advise on the process. It was reported in February 2025 that in preparation for the IPO, MetaX would lay off 200 employees. Insiders believe that by cutting costs and increasing revenue, this would increase the probability of a successful listing. On 17 December 2025, MetaX held its IPO becoming a listed company on the Shanghai Stock Exchange. Shares soared 693% on its debut.

In July 2026, MetaX filed for a secondary listing on the Hong Kong Stock Exchange.

== Product history ==
MetaX launched MXN series GPUs for AI inference, MXC series GPUs for AI training and general computing, and MXG series GPUs for graphical rendering.

In June 2023, MetaX successfully tested its first AI training GPU, C500, alongside its proprietary platform MACA 2.0. Built on a 7nm process and GPGPU architecture, the CUDA-compatible C500 delivers 15 TFLOPS FP32, approximately 75% of Nvidia's A100 GPU performance. The chip also supports multi-GPU interconnects for scalable performance. During the same month, MetaX launched its first AI inference GPU accelerator, N100, designed for cloud data centers and featuring a heterogeneous N100 core with HBM2E memory. It provides 160 TOPS INT8 and 80 TFLOPS FP16, ensuring high bandwidth, low latency, and supporting 128-channel encoding and 96-channel decoding for 8K video across formats such as HEVC, H.264, AV1, and AVS2. The N100 entered mass production in 2023, with broad applications in smart cities, security, smart transportation, cloud computing, and video processing.

In August 2023, MetaX optimized its C500 GPU for the ChatGLM2-6B bilingual AI model by Zhipu AI, ensuring efficient, stable performance.

In June 2024, MetaX's C-Series GPU clusters supported the Beijing Academy of Artificial Intelligence (BAAI) in pre-training a billion-parameter MoE AI model. In the same month, it was reported that that MetaX submitted downgraded designs of its chips to TSMC in late 2023 to comply with U.S. restrictions. Sources stated that MetaX developed a downgraded product called the C280 and earlier in the year, it had run out of stock of the C500.

By the end of 2024, MetaX had deployed nine compute clusters across China, scaling to over 10,000 GPUs in commercial operation.

== See also ==
- Cambricon Technologies
- Enflame
- Semiconductor industry in China
