= ACM Research =

US semiconductor equipment company

ACM Research, Inc.
- Type: Public
- Traded as: Nasdaq: ACMR; SSE: 688082 (Shanghai subsidiary); S&P 600 component
- Industry: Semiconductors
- Founded: 1998; 28 years ago
- Founder: David Wang
- Headquarters: Fremont, California, U.S.
- Key people: David Wang (chairman & CEO)
- Revenue: ▲US$557.72 million (2023)
- Net income: ▲US$96.85 million (2023)
- Total assets: ▲US$1.49 billion (2023)
- Total equity: ▲US$926.16 million (2023)
- Number of employees: 1,590 (2023)
- Subsidiaries: ACM Research (Shanghai), Inc.
- Website: acmr.com

ACM Research, Inc. (ACMR) is a publicly traded American semiconductor company that engages in the manufacture and sale of single-wafer wet cleaning equipment used to improve product yield.

Although based in the U.S., the majority of the company's business is done in China through its subsidiary, ACM Research (Shanghai).

== Background ==
ACMR was founded in Silicon Valley in 1998 by David Wang. Wang is credited with inventing stress-free copper polishing technology.

Initially the tools were positioned as a competitor to chemical metal planarization but did not find any success. Due to strong backing, ACMR pivoted and shifted focus to wafer cleaning by carving out a niche.

In 2005, ACMR and Shanghai Venture Capital Co. established a joint venture in Shanghai named ACM Research (Shanghai). It would become majority-owned by ACMR, and all major operations were eventually moved to China.

The first major customer for ACMR was SK Hynix who started placing orders for its cleaning tools in 2013. ACMR's proprietary technology, Space Alternated Phase Shift (SAPS) has been shown to be more effective at removing random defects on wafers than jet spray or conventional megasonic cleaning technologies.

In November 2017, ACMR held its initial public offering and became a publicly listed company on the Nasdaq exchange.

In December 2017, ACMR formed ACM Research Korea to better service SK Hynix and would focus on hardware design and manufacture.

In November 2021, ACMR (Shanghai) listed on the Shanghai Stock Exchange STAR Market.

In March 2022, the U.S. Securities and Exchange Commission named ACMR as a company that faced delisting if it didn't hand over detailed audit documents to support its financial statement. This came as a result of the Holding Foreign Companies Accountable Act. ACMR's stock price dropped 27% as a result. In response, ACMR changed its auditor from BDO China Shu Lun Pan in Shenzhen to Armanino in San Ramon, California so it would no longer be subject to the related delisting guidelines.

In April 2022, ACMR planned to build a fab equipment plant in Korea. It was speculated this was done for customers who wanted products to be made locally due to demands "by the US to exclude Chinese-made goods from entering its supply chain."

In December 2024, several of ACMR's subsidiaries were targeted in a new round of US export controls and the subsidiaries were added to the United States Department of Commerce's Entity List.

In December 2025, it was reported that Intel had tested wet etch tools from ACMR.

Key customers of ACMR include SK Hynix, SMIC, Hua Hong Semiconductor and Yangtze Memory Technologies. Apart from wafer cleaning, ACMR also has success in other areas such as electroplating for packaging firms.

== See also ==
- SK Hynix
- Semiconductor industry in China
