= Shanghai Venture Capital Co. =

Chinese state-owned venture capital and private equity firm

Shanghai Venture Capital Company 上海创业投资有限公司
- Type: State-owned enterprise
- Industry: Venture Capital, Private Equity
- Founded: 1999
- Headquarters: Shanghai, China
- Key people: Wang Pingao, President
- Owner: Shanghai Municipal People's Government
- Number of employees: 100

Shanghai Venture Capital Company ("SHVC") is one of China's largest state-owned venture capital/private equity firm. It is owned by the Shanghai Municipal People's Government.

Established in 1999, Shanghai Venture Capital Co. has been a dominant state-owned venture capital/private equity firm in China. SHVC was initially established with RMB¥ 600 million registered capital from the Shanghai municipal government.

== Investments ==
As of 2013, Shanghai Venture Capital Co. has invested a total of RMB¥ 2.4 billion in over 160 private companies, and had 7 IPOs. SHVC currently has over 100 employees and more than 30% has international experience. SHVC currently has RMB¥ 10 billion under management.

Shanghai Venture Capital Co. specializes in early stage and growth stage investments in the following areas:

- Clean energy
- Energy-efficient technologies
- Biomedical technologies
- New materials
- Information technologies

== Shareholders and Partners ==
SHVC's main shareholders include National Development and Reform Commission (NDRC), State-owned Assets Supervision and Administration Commission (SASAC), Chinese Academy of Sciences (CAS) etc.

SHVC has developed long-term alliance with Temasek Holdings, Tsinghua Venture Capitals, Shanghai International Trust Co., Fudan University, Shanghai Jiao Tong University Industry Group, and many other strategic partners.

== Related Parties ==
- National Development and Reform Commission
- State-owned Assets Supervision and Administration Commission
- Chinese Academy of Sciences
- Temasek Holdings
- Fudan University
- Shanghai Municipal Government
