= China Integrated Circuit Industry Investment Fund =

Chinese National Fund

China Integrated Circuit Industry Investment Fund Co., Ltd.
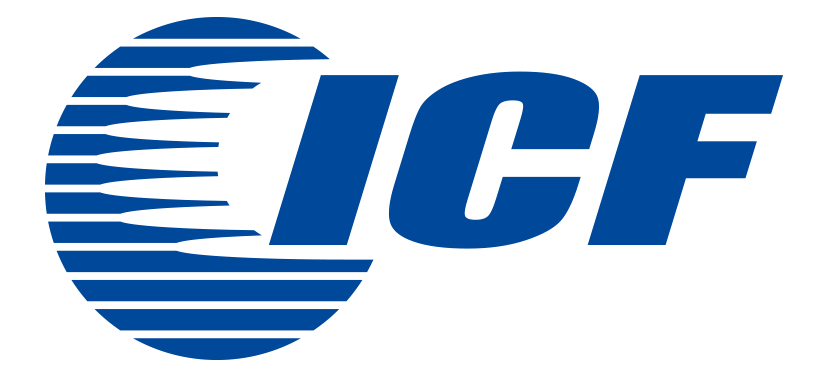
- Native name: 国家集成电路产业投资基金股份有限公司
- Type: State-owned enterprise
- Industry: Investment management
- Founded: 26 September 2014; 11 years ago
- Headquarters: Beijing, China
- Key people: Zhang Xin (President)
- AUM: US$95.7 billion (2024)
- Owners: Ministry of Finance (36.74%); China Development Bank (22.29%); China Tobacco (11.14%)

The China Integrated Circuit Industry Investment Fund (ICF; Chinese: 国家集成电路产业投资基金; pinyin: Guójiā Jíchéng Diànlù Chǎnyè Tóuzī Jījīn), also known as the National Integrated Circuit Industry Investment Fund and the Big Fund (Chinese: 国家大基金; pinyin: Guójiā Dàjījīn), is a China Government Guidance Fund. The fund aims to help China reach its national goal of achieving self-sufficiency in the semiconductor industry (as part of the Made in China 2025 plan) by investing in domestic semiconductor companies. It has played a significant role with regards to the semiconductor industry in China by funding companies such as SMIC, Hua Hong Semiconductor, and YMTC.

The fund has three phases respectively, with Big Fund I (2014 to 2019), Big Fund II (2019 to 2024), and Big Fund III (2024 to 2039). The fund's management company is Sino IC Capital.

== History ==
=== Preparation ===
In June 2014, the State Council of the People's Republic of China proposed in the National Integrated Circuit Industry Development Guidelines that a national investment fund should be set up to provide focused support for the development of the Integrated Circuit Industry. In August 2014, the fund management company, Sino IC Capital, was established by China Development Bank, which would own 45% of the company.

=== Phase I (2014 - 2019) ===
On 26 September 2014, ICF was established. According to a statement on the website of the Ministry of Industry and Information Technology (MIIT), it was set up to "invest in chip manufacturing, boost industrial production, and promote mergers and acquisitions". The fund operates as a corporate entity under MIIT and the Ministry of Finance. It adopted a two tier management structure where the board set the strategy and approved major projects while Sino IC Capital carried out the investments and managed the money. The near-term goal was growing annual revenue of domestic semiconductor companies from 2015 to 2020 and to become a global leader in all segments of the semiconductor supply chain by 2030.

According to MIIT, the fund raised US$21.8 billion in its first financing round in 2014. At the start, it deployed at least 60% of its capital into chipmaking investments, according to GF Securities. The performance of the first phase exceeded market expectations.

=== Phase II (2019 - 2024) ===
In 2019, ICF raised US$29.08 billion for its second phase. 75% of which went into wafer fabrication projects, according to CSC Financial. The investment approach was more conservative than the first phase, mainly focuses on the layout of the integrated circuit industry chain, focusing on chip manufacturing and equipment and materials, chip design, packaging and testing and other industry chain links, and supports the backbone of leading enterprises in the industry to grow bigger and stronger.

In July 2022, ICF, Sino IC Capital, and several current and former executives were investigated by the Chinese Communist Party's Central Commission for Discipline Inspection as part of an anti-graft crackdown. The scandal raised questions over the fund's efficiency and future value. the fund became dormant for a few months following the anti-graft investigations in July that lead to the downfall of its chief, Ding Wenwu. The fund resumed investment operations in early 2023 and on 10 March, selected Zhang Xin as its new head.

=== Phase III (2024 - 2029) ===
In September 2023, it was reported that ICF for its third phase was raising money for another fund with a fundraising target of around US$40 billion. In February 2024 it was reported the third fund would raise over US$27 billion. Investors included the Shanghai Municipal People's Government and State Development and Investment Corporation.

On 24 May 2024, the National Integrated Circuit Industry Investment Fund III Co., Ltd. was established with a registered capital of 344 billion yuan (US$47.5 billion), larger than the first two phases. Phase III is expected to continue the semiconductor industry chain "neck" link investment, including large-scale manufacturing and equipment, materials and other links, in addition to the HBM industry and other key areas of artificial intelligence semiconductor is also expected to obtain the Big Fund III investment. On 27 May, ICBC, Agricultural Bank of China, Construction Bank, Bank of China, Bank of Communications, Postal Savings Bank of China proposed a total of 114 billion yuan of capital, with a shareholding of 33.14%.

In January 2025, the National AI Industry Investment fund was launched with an initial capital of 60 billion yuan (US$8.2 billion). It is a joint venture between the Phase III fund and Guozhi Investment (Shanghai) Private Equity Fund Management.

== Operations ==
CF deploys its capital by holding minority stakes in publicly traded companies. Some of its investments are outside China. It also used to invest in investment firms such as Oriza Holdings via a fund of funds strategy, which allows it to indirectly invest further into more companies such as Ingenic Semiconductor. It has achieved success with investments in SMIC and Hua Hong Semiconductor but also has setbacks such as its investment in Tsinghua Unigroup, which had to undergo bankruptcy reorganization. The fund was a major tool in advancing the goals of Made in China 2025.

The largest shareholders of the fund include the Ministry of Finance, China Development Bank, China Tobacco, China Mobile, and China Electronics Technology Group Corporation, which are government agencies and state-owned enterprises.

The fund has a very low profile and does not even have its own website. It is stated to lack transparency.

== Investments ==
The fund's official mandate covers the integrated circuit supply chain, with chip manufacturing as the priority and additional support for design, packaging and testing, equipment, and materials. Reuters reported in 2024 that the Big Fund had provided financing to Semiconductor Manufacturing International Corporation (SMIC), Hua Hong Semiconductor, Yangtze Memory Technologies (YMTC), and smaller companies and funds.

In foundry investments, vehicles under the Big Fund jointly made a US$2.2 billion investment in one of SMIC's plants in 2020. The deal raised the plant's registered capital from US$3.5 billion to US$6.5 billion. In 2023, Hua Hong said China IC Fund II would subscribe for RMB shares worth 3 billion yuan as a strategic investor in a proposed share issue. In 2025, SMIC said it would take full control of SMNC through a share issue to five shareholders, including the National Integrated Circuit Industry Investment Fund.

The fund has also backed memory-chip projects. In 2023, registration records showed that the Big Fund had invested 14.56 billion yuan in Changxin Xinqiao, a memory-chip company, giving it 33.15% of the company's registered capital. Reuters reported that the investment followed a 13 billion-yuan investment in YMTC earlier in 2023. For the third phase, Reuters reported that one major focus would be equipment for chip manufacturing.

- AMEC
- ChangXin Memory Technologies
- Empyrean Technology
- GigaDevice
- Hangzhou Changchuan Technology
- Hangzhou Silan Microelectronics
- Hua Hong Semiconductor
- Ingenic Semiconductor
- JCET
- National Silicon Industry Group
- Oriza Holdings
- Piotech
- Shanghai Wanye Enterprises
- SMIC
- Tongfu Microelectronics
- Tsinghua Unigroup
- UNISOC
- YMTC
- ZTE
