= Zhejiang Jingsheng Mechanical & Electrical =

Chinese semiconductor equipment and material company

Zhejiang Jingsheng Mechanical & Electrical Co., Ltd.
- Trade name: JSG
- Native name: 浙江晶盛机电股份有限公司
- Company type: Public
- Traded as: SZSE: 300316
- Industry: Semiconductors; Advanced materials
- Founded: 14 December 2006; 19 years ago
- Founder: Qiu Minxiu
- Headquarters: Hangzhou, Zhejiang, China
- Key people: Cao Jianwei (Chairman); He Jun (CEO)
- Revenue: ▲CN¥17.98 billion (2023)
- Net income: ▲CN¥5.31 billion (2023)
- Total assets: ▲CN¥36.81 billion (2023)
- Total equity: ▲CN¥16.15 billion (2023)
- Number of employees: 7,495 (2023)
- Website: www.jsjd.cc

Zhejiang Jingsheng Mechanical & Electrical (JSG; Chinese: 晶盛机电; pinyin: Jīngshèng Jīdiàn) is a publicly listed Chinese company that engages in the development and sale of semiconductor related equipment and materials such as silicon carbide (SiC). It provides products and services to the semiconductor and photovoltaic industries.

== Background ==
In 2005, Zhejiang University mechanical engineering professor, Qiu Minxiu retired from her post at the university. She is the wife of Lu Yongxiang who at the time was President of the Chinese Academy of Sciences. In 2006, Qiu lead a project that involved electromechanical companies and universities such as Zhejiang University and Hangzhou Dianzi University which would develop technologies related to growingmonocrystalline silicon. Near the end of the year, JSG was established as a company to commercialize the project.

On 11 May 2012, JSG held its initial public offering becoming a listed company on the Shenzhen Stock Exchange.

In 2016, Qiu stepped down from managing JSG. She was succeeded by her former student, Cao Jianwei who became chairman and her son, He Jun who became CEO.

Since 2017, JSG has been deeply engaged in SiC ingot growth equipment and process development, achieving the successful production of 6-inch and 8-inch SiC ingots and substrates.

JSG attempted to set up a joint venture with the Hong Kong arm of Applied Materials to buy its screen printing equipment business in Italy. However, in November 2021, Italian prime minister Mario Draghi vetoed the takeover to prevent it proceeding. The reason was the takeover could have consequences in the strategic semiconductor sector for Italy.

== See also ==
- Silicon carbide
- Applied Materials
- Semiconductor industry in China
