= Semiconductor industry in China =

The Chinese semiconductor industry, including integrated circuit design and manufacturing, forms a major part of mainland China's electric technology industry.

China's semiconductor industry consists of a wide variety of companies, from integrated device manufacturers to pure-play foundries, fabless semiconductor companies and OSAT companies. Integrated device manufacturers (IDMs) design and manufacture integrated circuits. Pure-play foundries only manufacture devices for other companies, without designing them, while fabless semiconductor companies only design devices. Examples of Chinese IDMs are YMTC and CXMT; examples of Chinese pure-play foundries are SMIC, Hua Hong Semiconductor and Wingtech; examples of Chinese fabless companies are Zhaoxin, HiSilicon, Loongson and UNISOC; and examples of Chinese OSAT companies are JCET, Huatian Technology and Tongfu Microelectronics.

== Overview ==
China is currently the world's largest semiconductor market in terms of consumption. In 2020, China represented 53.7% of worldwide chip sales, or $239.45 billion out of $446.1 billion. However, a large percentage are imported from multinational suppliers. In 2020, imports took up over 83% ($199.7 billion) of total chip sales. In response, the country launched a number of initiatives to reduce its reliance on foreign companies. To reduce reliance on foreign semiconductor companies, CICF pools resources from state investors including the Ministry of Finance, China Tobacco, China Mobile, and China Development Bank.

In 2022, the country announced a Made in China 2025 goal of 70% domestic production.

China leads the world in terms of number of new fabs under construction, with 8 out of 19 worldwide in 2021. A total of 17 fabs were expected to start construction between 2021 and 2023. Total installed capacity of Chinese-owned chipmakers was also set to increase from 2.96 million wafers per month (wpm) in 2020 to 3.57 million wpm in 2021.

In 2025, Morgan Stanley estimated that China had a 41% self-sufficiency ratio in AI chips, up from 10% in 2020, with the number expected to increase to 86% by 2030.

== History ==
=== Soviet-style system of industry ===
The semiconductor industry in China began between a period in 1956, along with the country's first transistor produced in a state lab. In 1965, China created their first integrated circuit. From 1956 to 1990, the industry followed a Soviet-style system of industrial organization. China's State Council prioritized semiconductor technology in its "Outline for Science and Technology Development, 1956–1967," leading to the establishment of semiconductor-related degree programs in five major universities. The Huajing Group's Wuxi Factory No. 742, operational from 1960, played a crucial role in training industry experts and supporting subsequent industrial strategies.

In the mid-1960s through the late 1960s, China began a semiconductor program.

During the 1970s, China's semiconductor industry operated with research conducted in state labs and manufacturing in separate state-owned factories, hindering technology transfer. Most of the approximately 40 factories focused on producing basic diodes and transistors rather than integrated circuits (ICs). The Cultural Revolution from 1965 to 1975 further disrupted industry progress. However by 1972, China was producing third-generation computers.

Deng Xiaoping's economic reforms starting in 1978 initiated significant changes. By the early 1980s, under the sixth Five-Year Plan (1981-1985), the State Council formed a "Computer and Large Scale IC Lead Group" to modernize the industry. Despite importing 24 secondhand semiconductor lines by 1985, only the Wuxi Factory No. 742 met production targets. Efforts then narrowed to focus on five key firms, but cumulative setbacks left the industry lagging behind global leaders.

=== End of the 20th century ===
In the 1990s, China adopted a strategy of concentrating resources on a few large firms to foster partnerships with foreign companies, aiming to accelerate technological advancement. Initiatives included joint ventures with Nortel, Philips, NEC, and ITT starting in the late 1980s and early 1990s. The eighth Five-Year Plan (1991-1995) focused on developing Huajing (operator of Wuxi Factory No. 742) into a leading integrated device manufacturer (IDM), supported by significant funding and a joint venture with Lucent Technologies. However, delays in implementation resulted in outdated manufacturing technologies and slower market entry. The ninth Five-Year Plan (1996-2000) introduced Project 909, aiming for a domestic firm, Huahong, to produce internationally competitive chips using Chinese intellectual property and engineers. While Huahong successfully partnered with NEC to enter production promptly, reliance on Japanese expertise limited knowledge transfer. Economic downturns in the global DRAM market by 2002 led to significant financial losses for Huahong, prompting changes in its partnership and operational strategies.

=== 21st century ===
In 2014, the China Integrated Circuit Industry Investment Fund was established in an effort to reduce dependence on foreign semiconductor companies. In addition to the China Integrated Circuit Industry Investment Fund, many other China government guidance funds also frequently invest in companies in the semiconductor industry.

Due to the rapid pace of Chinese semiconductor industry advances, on 7 October 2022, the United States government announced a major set of export restrictions toward China, with a focus on artificial Intelligence and semiconductor technologies, with the aim of disrupting the development of China's semiconductor industry. In January 2023, these export controls were made multilateral with an agreement between the governments of the United States, Japan, and the Netherlands. Between October 2022 and May 2023, China's government responded with a diverse set of measures, including filing a suit in the World Trade Organization.

On 26 December 2023, China prohibited the use of CPUs made by US companies Intel and AMD for Chinese government PCs and servers. The country instead approved 18 processors made by Chinese companies Loongson and Phytium. State-owned companies were also instructed to transition towards Chinese hardware by 2027. The ban was part of China's strategy to rely more on its domestically designed options in response to US sanctions and export controls.

On 15 September 2024, China announced significant advancements in its domestic semiconductor industry, promoting two new deep ultraviolet (DUV) lithography machines. One of the machines operates at a wavelength of 193 nm with a resolution below 65 nm and an overlay accuracy below 8 nm. The second machine has a wavelength of 248 nm, with 110 nm resolution and 25 nm overlay accuracy. Gregory C. Allen, a prominent AI and semiconductor industry analyst and former U.S. government official, wrote that "From 2023 to 2025, Chinese companies purchased roughly 230 immersion DUV lithography systems from ASML. So while Aishengna’s current capabilities align with ASML’s early production scaling, they are still nowhere near the overall capabilities of the incumbent."

In July 2025, the U.S. government planned to restrict AI chip shipments to Thailand and Malaysia due to Chinese smuggling concerns. In December 2025, Reuters reported that China had secretly completed a prototype extreme ultraviolet (EUV) lithography machine in Shenzhen, which was expected to produce working chips between 2028 and 2030. Reuters reported on 14 May 2026 that the United States Department of Commerce had approved 10 companies, including Alibaba Group, Tencent, ByteDance, and JD.com, and distributors including Lenovo and Foxconn, for purchasing NVIDIA's H200 chips.

On 27 May 2026, Taiwan prosecutors detained three people over a case involving the alleged smuggling of Nvidia AI chips to China via Japan. The chips were reportedly exported with falsified documents in violation of US export rules.

== Foreign companies ==
Samsung, who is currently the world's largest producer of NAND flash memory, has two plants in Xi'an which accounts for 42.5% percent of its total production capacity, and 15.3% of worldwide NAND production capacity. It was the company's largest overseas investment in chip production with an initial cost of $7 billion.

== Domestic companies ==
=== Integrated Device Manufacturers (IDMs) ===
==== Yangtze Memory Technologies Corp (YMTC) ====
Yangtze Memory Technologies Corp (YMTC) is a Chinese semiconductor integrated device manufacturer specializing in flash memory (NAND) chips. Founded in Wuhan, China in 2016, the company received backing from Tsinghua Unigroup. Prior to YMTC, China had no company capable of producing flash memory. Its consumer products are marketed under the brand Zhitai.

In 2020, YMTC was using a 20 nm process to make 64-layer 3D NAND flash. In April 2020, the company unveiled its first 128 layers vertical NAND chip, then the most advanced layer count in mass production, based on XTacking architecture, which then entered production.

In 2021, YMTC was producing around 80,000 wafers per month, with plans to expand its first plant to reach 100,000 wpm capacity by 2022; this would have given the company around 6-8% of global market share.

==== ChangXin Memory Technologies (CXMT) ====
ChangXin Memory Technologies (CXMT) is a Chinese semiconductor integrated device manufacturer headquartered in Hefei, Anhui specializing in the production of DRAM memory. As of 2020, ChangXin can manufacture LPDDR4 and DDR4 RAM on a 19 nm process with a capacity of 40,000 wafers per month. The company plans to increase output to 120,000 wpm and launch 17 nm (LP)DDR5 by end of 2022, with a target total capacity of 300,000 wpm in the mid-long term.

==== Hangzhou Silan Microelectronics ====
Hangzhou Silan Microelectronics is a Chinese semiconductor company headquartered in Hangzhou. The company focuses on the design of integrated circuit (IC) chip and the manufacturing of semiconductor microelectronics-related products. It is one of the largest integrated device manufacturers (IDM) in China.

==== Other companies ====
- Silergy

=== Pure-play foundries ===
==== Semiconductor Manufacturing International Corporation (SMIC) ====
Semiconductor Manufacturing International Corporation (SMIC) is a partially state-owned publicly listed Chinese pure-play semiconductor foundry company. It is the largest contract chip maker in mainland China and 5th largest globally, with a market share of 5.3% in the second quarter of 2021.

SMIC is headquartered in Shanghai and incorporated in the Cayman Islands. It has wafer fabrication sites throughout mainland China, offices in the United States, Italy, Japan, and Taiwan, and a representative office in Hong Kong. It provides integrated circuit (IC) manufacturing services on 350 nm to 14 nm process technologies. State-owned civilian and military telecommunications equipment provider Datang Telecom Group as well as the China National Integrated Circuit Industry Investment Fund are major shareholders of SMIC.

==== Hua Hong Semiconductor ====
Hua Hong Semiconductor Limited is a publicly listed Chinese pure-play semiconductor foundry company based in Shanghai, established in 1996 as part of China's national efforts to boost its IC industry. Currently, Hua Hong's most advanced node is achieved by its subsidiary Shanghai Huali (HLMC), which in 2022 could manufacture a 28/22 nm process; in 2022 advanced 14 nm technology was being developed by the company.

Hua Hong Semiconductor is currently mainland China's second largest chip-maker behind rival SMIC and the 6th largest globally, with a market share of 2.6% in the second quarter of 2021.

==== Other companies ====
- Nexchip
- United Nova Technology
- Wingtech

==== Trade Restriction Impact ====
Chinese foundry players performed well in 2024, with a high utilization rate (UTR) of around 87% expected in 2025, thanks to the "Design by China + Manufacturing in China" policy and competitive wafer pricing. The "China+1" policy is leading to more orders being transferred from China to Taiwan, improving Taiwan's UTR, which IDC projects to be 79% in 2025. See chart on the citation link

=== Fabless companies ===
==== HiSilicon ====
HiSilicon is a Chinese fabless semiconductor company based in Shenzhen, Guangdong and wholly owned by Huawei. HiSilicon purchases licenses for CPU designs from ARM Holdings, including the ARM Cortex-A9 MPCore, ARM Cortex-M3, ARM Cortex-A7 MPCore, ARM Cortex-A15 MPCore, ARM Cortex-A53, ARM Cortex-A57 and also for their Mali graphics cores. HiSilicon has also purchased licenses from Vivante Corporation for their GC4000 graphics core.

HiSilicon is reputed to be the largest domestic designer of integrated circuits in China. In 2020, the U.S. instituted rules that require American firms providing certain equipment to HiSilicon or non-American firms who use American technologies that supply HiSilicon to have licenses and Huawei announced it will stop producing its Kirin chipset from 15 September 2020, onwards. HiSilicon was overtaken by Chinese rival UNISOC in terms of mobile processor market share as a consequence. However, at the end of 2023 the Kirin 9000S processor, which was first used in the Huawei Mate 60, showed that HiSilicon was restarting its production of Kirin chipsets after a three-year hiatus, this time with entirely domestically produced chips.

==== Hygon Information Technology ====
Hygon Information Technology is a partially state-owned publicly listed Chinese fabless semiconductor company headquartered in Beijing. The company mainly handles central processing units (CPUs) based on Intel's x86 technology as well as domestic Deep Learning Processors.

==== Loongson Technology ====
Loongson Technology is a Chinese fabless company that develops a family of general-purpose, MIPS architecture-compatible microprocessors, mainly used in personal computers and supercomputers. The processors were favoured by the Chinese government in its “Made in China 2025” push, which was also directed against US semiconductor sanctions.

==== UNISOC ====
UNISOC is a Chinese fabless semiconductor company headquartered in Shanghai which produces chipsets for mobile phones. UNISOC develops its business in two major fields: consumer electronics, which includes smart phones, feature phones, smart audio systems, smart wear and other areas; Industrial electronics, on the other hand, covers such fields as LAN IoT, WAN IoT, or smart display.

In 2021, it was the fourth largest mobile processor manufacturer in the world, after Mediatek, Qualcomm and Apple, with 9% of global market share.

==== Will Semiconductor (OmniVision Group) ====
Will Semiconductor is a publicly listed Chinese fabless semiconductor company headquartered in Shanghai. In May 2019, it acquired OmniVision Technologies.

==== Zhaoxin ====
Zhaoxin is a fabless semiconductor company, created in 2013 as a joint venture between VIA Technologies and the Shanghai Municipal Government. The company manufactures x86-compatible desktop and laptop CPUs. The term Zhào xīn means million core. (Note: In China 兆 can mean either short-scale million (1e6) or trillion (1e12). However, for IT-related topics 兆 always means mega/million in Mainland China.) The processors are created mainly for the Chinese market: the venture is an attempt to reduce the Chinese dependence on foreign technology.

==== Other companies ====
- Actions Semiconductor
- Allwinner Technology
- Black Sesame Technologies
- Cambricon
- Enflame
- GigaDevice
- Horizon Robotics
- Iluvatar CoreX
- Ingenic Semiconductor
- Innoscience
- Jiangnan Computing Lab (Sunway)
- Kunlunxin
- Maxscend Microelectronics
- MetaX
- Montage Technology
- Moore Threads
- Phytium Technology
- PNC Process Systems
- Rockchip
- Sanan Optoelectronics
- T-Head
- Tencent

=== Outsourced Semiconductor Assembly and Test (OSAT) ===
==== JCET ====
JCET Group Co., Ltd. is a public company headquartered in Jiangyin on China's eastern coast. It is the largest Outsourced Semiconductor Assembly and Test (OSAT) company in mainland China and the third-largest globally. JCET was formed in 1972, when Jiangyin converted a local factory to produce transistors. JCET went public on the Shanghai Stock Exchange in 2003 and continued to grow over time. JCET provides a range of semiconductor packaging, assembly, manufacturing, and testing products and services.

==== Other companies ====
- Huatian Technology
- Tongfu Microelectronics

=== Semiconductor equipment manufacturers ===
==== Advanced Micro-Fabrication Equipment (AMEC) ====
Advanced Micro-Fabrication Equipment is a partially state-owned publicly listed Chinese company that manufactures semiconductor chip production equipment. It is one of the largest semiconductor equipment manufacturer in China.

==== NAURA Technology Group ====
NAURA Technology Group is a partially state-owned publicly listed Chinese company that manufactures semiconductor chip production equipment. It is currently the largest semiconductor equipment manufacturer in China.

==== Shanghai Micro Electronics Equipment (SMEE) ====
Shanghai Micro Electronics Equipment (SMEE) is a semiconductor manufacturing equipment manufacturer based in Shanghai, supplying lithography (DUV immersion) equipment and other equipment used in the semiconductor manufacturing industry. Currently, its most advanced product is the SSA600, with a resolution of 90 nm. SMEE is developing the SSA800, with a resolution of 28 nm, which will be followed up by the SSA900, with a resolution of 22 nm. In December 2022, the United States Department of Commerce added SMEE to the Bureau of Industry and Security's Entity List.

==== China Electronics Technology Group Corporation (CETC) ====
China Electronics Technology Group Corporation (CETC) is China's third largest electronics and IT company behind only Huawei and Lenovo. Its fields include communications equipment, computers, electronic equipment, IT infrastructure, networks, software development, research services, investment and asset management for civilian and military applications.

The company also manufactures semiconductors and semiconductor equipment used in the semiconductor manufacturing industry, largely for military applications.

==== Other companies ====
- ACM Research
- Beijing Huafeng Test & Control Technology
- China Resources Microelectronics
- Dongfang Jingyuan Electron
- Hangzhou Changchuan Technology
- Hwatsing Technology
- KINGSEMI
- Jingjia Micro
- Piotech
- Shanghai Wanye Enterprises
- SiCarrier
- Skyverse Technology
- Wuhan Jingce Electronic Group
- Zhejiang Jingsheng Mechanical & Electrical

=== Other developments ===
==== Huawei ====
Huawei is reportedly planning to build its own fabs, in cooperation with SMIC, in an attempt to promote vertical integration and reduce impacts of US sanctions such as the one it was subjected to during the China–United States trade war. In 2023, Huawei released its Mate60 Pro smartphone, which had a 7 nm chip application processor HiSilicon Kirin 9000S manufactured by SMIC using SMIC's N+2 process node. In 2025, Huawei founder Ren Zhengfei told General Secretary of the Chinese Communist Party Xi Jinping at a meeting that "his previous concerns about the lack of domestic advanced semiconductor production and the damaging impacts of U.S. export controls had eased because of recent breakthroughs by Huawei and its partners."

== See also ==
- Semiconductor industry
  - Semiconductor industry in India
  - Semiconductor industry in South Korea
  - Semiconductor industry in Taiwan
- List of semiconductor companies in the United States
- Economy of China
- Industry of China
