= Efficient Power Conversion =

Efficient Power Conversion (EPC) is a semiconductor company that produces transistors and integrated circuits based on gallium nitride (GaN).

== History ==
The company was founded in 2007 by Alex Lidow, Joe Cao and Robert Beach, with Lidow continuing as CEO. The company is based in El Segundo, California. Its eGaN® FETs and ICs are widely used in the Light Detection and Ranging (Lidar) systems for self-driving and autonomous vehicles, such as the lidar systems developed by Velodyne. In 2020, the company entered into a joint venture with VPT to form EPC Space which provides radiation-hardened GaN devices for space applications.

== Products ==
In 2023, the 40V 4mΩ radiation-hardened GaN FET EPC7001 was introduced. The company launched the EPC2361, a 100V 1mΩ GaN FET in 2024, which it claims was the smallest available at the time with a footprint of 3mm by 5mm.
