= United States New Export Controls on Advanced Computing and Semiconductors to China =

U.S export controls targeting semiconductors

Commerce Implements New Export Controls on Advanced Computing and Semiconductor Manufacturing Items to the People's Republic of China (PRC)

Effective October 7, 2022, the United States implemented new export controls targeting the People's Republic of China's (PRC) ability to access and develop advanced computing and semiconductor manufacturing items. The new export controls reflect the United States' ambition to counter the accelerating advancement of China's high-tech capabilities in these spaces to address its foreign policy and national security concerns.

== Background of new export controls ==
=== Huawei and ZTE equipment ban ===
In August 2018, President Trump signed the National Defense Authorization Act for Fiscal Year 2019 (NDAA 2019). The act prohibited the use and procurement of Huawei and ZTE equipment from being used by all U.S. federal government executive agencies, citing security concerns. In June 2020 the U.S. federal government officially designated Huawei and ZTE as threats to national security due to their close ties to the Chinese Communist Party and China's military. As for the reasoning for this classification, spokesman for the United States Federal Communications Commission (FCC) Ajit Pai quoted the fact that both companies are broadly subjected to Chinese law, therefore, obligating them to comply with Chinese intelligence services.

The Chinese technology company ban spurred Chinese home-grown chip demand to skyrocket. According to Bloomberg in 2021, nineteen of the world's twenty fastest-growing chip industry firms originate in China. That is up from just eight Chinese companies in 2020. Additionally, according to the World Semiconductor Trade Statistics (WSTS) and the Semiconductor Industry Association (SIA) estimates, China accounted for 35 percent of the global semiconductor market in 2021, taking the spot for the largest single-country market.

=== COVID-19 induced global chip shortage ===
Since early 2020 when COVID-19 lockdowns began globally, the demand for semiconductors has skyrocketed. As of April 2021, over 169 different industries were impacted by the lack of supply of semiconductors according to an analysis by Goldman Sachs. The lack of supply of semiconductors in these industries could impact U.S. GDP by up to 1%. Withholding exports of modern semiconductors could enable local prices to drop in the United States and put the U.S. consumer first.

== Export control rulings ==
The official document, "Commerce Implements New Export Controls on Advanced Computing and Semiconductor Manufacturing Items to the People's Republic of China (PRC)", issued for immediate release on October 7, 2022, by the Department of Commerce's Bureau of Industry and Security details the new export control rulings. Specifically, the rules can be seen below.

1. Adds certain advanced and high-performance computing chips and computer commodities that contain such chips to the Commerce Control List (CCL);
2. Adds new license requirements for items destined for a supercomputer or semiconductor development or production end use in the PRC;
3. Expands the scope of the Export Administration Regulations (EAR) over certain foreign-produced advanced computing items and foreign produced items for supercomputer end uses;
4. Expands the scope of foreign-produced items subject to license requirements to twenty-eight existing entities on the Entity List that are located in the PRC;
5. Adds certain semiconductor manufacturing equipment and related items to the CCL;
6. Adds new license requirements for items destined to a semiconductor fabrication "facility" in the PRC that fabricates ICs meeting specified. Licenses for facilities owned by PRC entities will face a "presumption of denial," and facilities owned by multinationals will be decided on a case-by-case basis. The relevant thresholds are as follows:
  - Logic chips with non-planar transistor architectures (I.e., FinFET or GAAFET) of 16 nm or 14 nm, or below;
  - DRAM memory chips of 18 nm half-pitch or less;
  - NAND flash memory chips with 128 layers or more.
7. Restricts the ability of U.S. persons to support the development, or production, of ICs at certain PRC-located semiconductor fabrication "facilities" without a license;
8. Adds new license requirements to export items to develop or produce semiconductor manufacturing equipment and related items; and
9. Establishes a Temporary General License (TGL) to minimize the short-term impact on the semiconductor supply chain by allowing specific, limited manufacturing activities related to items destined for use outside the PRC.

Rulings affecting the ability of U.S. people to assist in the development and/or manufacturing of semiconductors without a license come into effect on October 12, 2022. All other rulings begin taking effect on October 21, 2022.

== United States objective ==
The United States Department of Commerce's Bureau of Industry and Security stated that the new export controls were a part of a series of targeted updates to its export controls as part of BIS's ongoing efforts to protect U.S. national security and foreign policy interests. The export controls directly restrict the PRC's ability to obtain, develop, and manufacture advanced semiconductor technology.

Jordan Schneider, a senior analyst at the Rhodium Group, said "This is an effort that is going to take hundreds of billions of dollars and an incredible amount of engineering talent and energy to recreate a semiconductor supply chain that doesn't involve U.S. technology," He said the cutting edge of the semiconductor supply chain is both "globalized, but also so specialized, that at any step in it there's only a handful of firms in the world that can do it, and if you're sort of locked out of any one of these steps, then you can't make chips." The United States' new export controls have fully leveraged the fragile nature of the industry. This announcement, the most expansive export control action in decades, represents a fundamental shift in the traditional strategy underlying the U.S. and allied export control regime.

Intended restrictions of the export controls include limiting AI chip access, limiting Chinese design capability, stifling advanced chip manufacturing, and limiting access to chip manufacturing technology. These objectives are met by limiting both semiconductor design and manufacturing hardware, computer-aided design (CAD) tools, and human capital.

=== Chinese semiconductor applications in the military ===
The BIS cited China's use of advanced semiconductors used in their military as a main reason for the new export bans. Specifically, the United States claims China's access to advanced semiconductors enables their military to produce advanced military systems including weapons of mass destruction, improve the speed and accuracy of military decision-making, planning, and logistics, autonomous systems, and finally to commit human rights abuses.

=== Maintaining a global lead in artificial intelligence ===
Assistant Secretary of Commerce for Export Administration Thea D. Rozman Kendler stated "The PRC has poured resources into developing supercomputing capabilities and seeks to become a world leader in artificial intelligence by 2030. It is using these capabilities to monitor, track, and surveil its citizens, and fuel its military modernization." Gregory C. Allen, a former Pentagon AI official, described the U.S. semiconductor export controls as a multi-layered strategy aimed at "Choking off China's Access to the Future of AI."

According to the 2021 final report from the U.S. Department of National Security Commission on Artificial Intelligence, if China does manage to leapfrog the United States and its allies in chip technology, it will gain the upper hand militarily "in every domain of warfare". This initiative is key to the U.S.'s ambitions in preventing China's access to advanced computing and semiconductors along with limiting its ability to develop and manufacture its own to maintain a global edge in artificial intelligence capabilities.

=== Restricting human capital to China ===
Rule #7, restricting the ability of U.S. persons to work at China-located semiconductor facilities, will force U.S. citizens as well as green card holders to leave and stay out of China's semiconductor industry. This will disrupt the current semiconductor facilities operating in China as active U.S. employees will be forced to leave, effective October 12, 2022. This export control will also result in extended pain for PRC as less human expertise will be available to help accelerate the growth in China's advanced semiconductor industry from the United States.

== Industry implications ==
=== Financial impact ===
Following the announcement of export controls, the share prices in both United States and China high-tech sectors dropped.

Days after the BIS announcement, the head of a leading Taiwanese supplier to Apple warned the tech world to get ready for "casualties and consequences" from the U.S. measures, likening them to "earthquakes."

Due to the sweeping impact and scope of the export controls the industry recognizes that the global semiconductor ecosystem will necessitate a rewiring requiring firms to adapt. For example, it is likely firms will recalculate business models, update roadmaps, and forge new, more resilient partnerships up and down the supply chain. In the world's most globalized industry, changes of this magnitude are bound to be expensive. An expense that is likely to be passed to the consumer.

=== Reduced research ===
According to some U.S. semiconductor firms, the new export controls will have "negative ripple effects" on future investment in research. They cite a decrease in sales to China and a congested supply chain which in turn reduces revenues, thereby reducing capital previously allocated to fund research for the next generation of chips or equipment. This is especially significant since China consistently accounts for around 50 percent of global chip sales by revenue, being by far the largest single market.

=== Legacy chips ===
The new export controls focus primarily on the cutting-edge of the semiconductor manufacturing and design process. Where these export controls are effective in slowing the PRC's growing advantage in the most advanced semiconductor technology, it does not significantly impact China's ability to continue manufacturing older, "legacy", chips which are still widely used and in demand for a plethora of applications such as automobiles, renewable technology, consumer electronics, telecommunication systems, and many weapon systems. Older chip technology is and will be, significant economically to China despite the U.S. export controls. However, due to the United States' codependent reliance on imported Chinese-manufactured legacy chips, this was likely considered in the export control scope.
