= Tongfu Microelectronics =

Chinese Semiconductor Company

Tongfu Microelectronics Co., Ltd.
- Trade name: TFME
- Native name: 通富微电子股份有限公司
- Formerly: Nantong Fujitsu Microelectronics
- Company type: Public
- Traded as: SZSE: 002156
- Industry: Semiconductors
- Predecessor: Nantong Transistor Factory
- Founded: June 1997; 29 years ago
- Founder: Shi Mingda
- Headquarters: Nantong, Jiangsu, China
- Key people: Shi Lei (Chairman & CEO)
- Revenue: ▲CN¥22.27 billion (2023)
- Net income: ▼CN¥216.00 million (2023)
- Total assets: ▼CN¥34.88 billion (2023)
- Total equity: ▲CN¥14.69 billion (2023)
- Owner: Nantong Huada Microelectronics Group (19.91%); China Integrated Circuit Industry Investment Fund (11.26%)
- Number of employees: 19,975 (2023)
- Subsidiaries: TF-AMD
- Website: www.tfme.com

Tongfu Microelectronics (TFME; Chinese: 通富微电; pinyin: Tōngfù Wéidiàn) is a publicly listed Chinese semiconductor company headquartered in Nantong, Jiangsu.

It is one of the largest Outsourced Semiconductor Assembly and Test (OSAT) companies in mainland China. It has a focus on developing advanced packaging for HPC, new energy, automotive electronics, and memory sectors.

== Background ==
The origins of TFME can be traced to Nantong Transistor Factory, a state-owned enterprise established in 1966 to produce transistors. After the reform and opening up, overseas products came into the market and state-owned enterprise like Nantong Transistor Factory which lacked competitiveness would go into financial distress. By the end of the 1980s, the factory was one of the poorest enterprises in Nantong and was close to bankruptcy.

In 1990, Nanjing University graduate, Shi Mingda who was a long term employee of the factory and had become the factory manager decided along with several other employees to acquire the factory. The factory was restructured to a joint-stock company and renamed to Nantong Huada Microelectronics.

In 1994, Nantong Huada Microelectronics entered a partnership with Fujitsu where it would transfer the technology to it to assemble logic chips, including microcontrollers and linear integrated circuits, for consumer electronics. Originally a joint venture was suggested but rejected as Fujitsu wanted to try a partnership first.

In 1997, Nantong Huada Microelectronics and Fujitsu established a joint venture named Nantong Fujitsu Microelectronics (NFME) to assemble and test integrated circuit products. Nantong Huada Microelectronics held 60% to take lead in its management while Fujitsu held 40%.

On 16 August 2007, NFME held its initial public offering becoming a listed company on the Shenzhen Stock Exchange.

In October 2015, AMD agreed to sell the majority of its interests in two of its Asian manufacturing operations (Suzhou and Penang, Malaysia) to NFME for $371 million. The deal would involve spinning out the operations into a joint venture with NFME with NFME holding 85% and AMD holding 15%. 1,700 AMD workers at the two factories would become employees of the joint venture.

In December 2016, NFME changed its name to Tongfu Microelectronics and removed the Fujitsu branding.

In 2018, due to change in business strategy, Fujitsu sold its holdings in TFME to various Chinese stakeholders which included the China Integrated Circuit Industry Investment Fund.

In May 2024, it was reported that ChangXin Memory Technologies was partnering with TFME to produce High Bandwidth Memory semiconductors to reduce foreign reliance. In January 2025, it was reported that TFME had started production.

== See also ==
- AMD
- Fujitsu
- JCET
- Huatian Technology
- Semiconductor industry in China
