= T-Head =

Alibaba semiconductor subsidiary

T-Head Semiconductor Co., Ltd.
- Trade name: T-Head
- Native name: 平头哥半导体有限公司
- Type: Subsidiary
- Industry: Semiconductors
- Founded: September 2018; 8 years ago
- Headquarters: Hangzhou, Zhejiang, China
- Parent: Alibaba Group
- Website: www.t-head.cn

T-Head Semiconductor Co., Ltd. (T-Head; Chinese: 平头哥半导体; pinyin: Píngtóugē Bàndǎotǐ) is the semiconductor subsidiary of Alibaba Group.

T-Head focuses on the open-source instruction set architecture RISC-V in its processor design.

== History ==
In April 2018, Alibaba Group announced it would acquire C-Sky Microsystems, a designer of 32-bit embedded CPU processing cores. C-Sky was founded in Hangzhou in 2001 and was the first chip company in the world to receive a sizable investment from Alibaba. The timing came shortly after the U.S. government put a ban on selling chips and other components to ZTE. It was speculated that the acquisition was part of the plan to make China's integrated circuit industry self-sufficient. Following the acquisition, Jack Ma stated Alibaba had invested in five semiconductor companies in the past four years.

In September 2018, Alibaba announced the establishment of a new semiconductor subsidiary company called T-Head which is known as Pingtouge in China. It was spun out of Alibaba's research institute DAMO Academy. Pingtouge, which translates to "flat head brother", is the nickname given by Chinese internet users to the honey badger. The name was chosen as honey badgers were said to be brave and smart despite being small, which represented the spirit the new company aimed for.

In July 2020, it was reported that Allwinner Technology and T-Head signed an agreement develop chips based on T-Head's XuanTie processor series.

In March 2023, it was reported that T-Head was putting more effort into RISC-V chips as China was betting on the open-source chip design architecture as a means of achieving greater self-sufficiency in the semiconductor space in the face of US sanctions. At that point in time, T-Head had launched a total of eight RISC-V processors. Alipay stated it would be introducing RISC-V chips developed by itself and T-Head that will enable secure payment functions on wearable devices.

In November 2026, T-Head filed for an initial public offering on the Hong Kong Stock Exchange.

== Product history ==
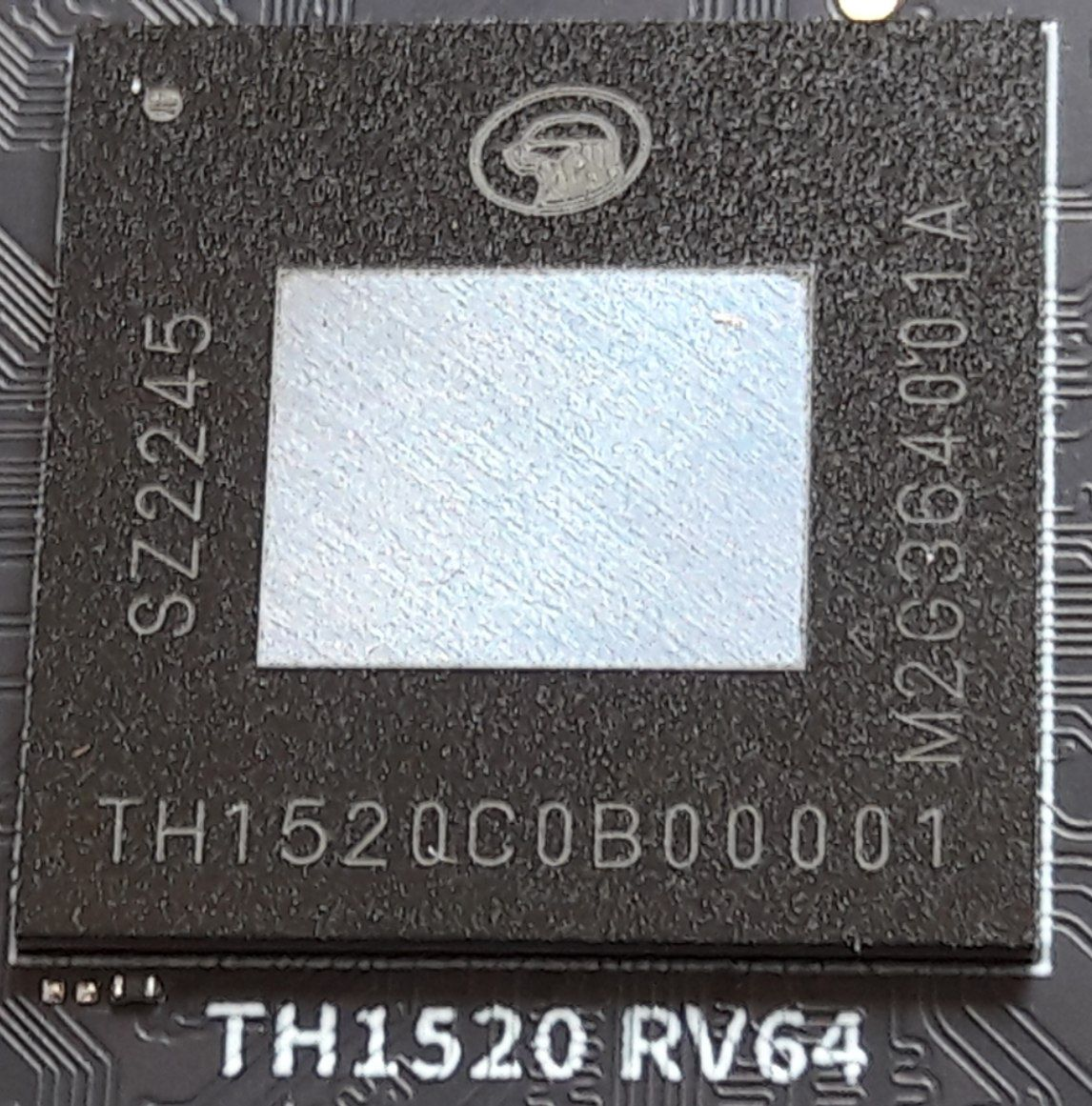
THead TH1520 SoC

In Jul 2019, Alibaba announced it had developed the XuanTie 910 which was the first CPU chip designed by T-Head. Based on RISC-V design, the chip was designed for IoT applications.

In September 2019, Alibaba announced it had developed the Hanguang 800, its first self-developed AI chip. It was developed by DAMO Academy and T-Head.

In October 2021, Alibaba announced it had developed the Yitian 710 that will be used for cloud computing operations. It was designed by T-Head based on ARM architecture and used the 5nm process. According to an IEEE study in March 2024, Yitian 710 was the fastest Arm-based CPU for cloud servers.

In November 2023, T-Head launched the Zhenyue 510, a controller integrated circuit for enterprise solid state drives used in cloud data centers.

In September 2025, according to a report by China Central Television, T-Head had developed its latest AI chips series, the PPU which was said to have comparable performance to Nvidia's H20 and A800 GPUs. The chips were used by China Unicom.

Alibaba released its Zhenwu line of AI chips, developed by T-Head, in 2026. The Zhenwu 810E was announced in January, followed by the Zhenwu M890 in May.

== See also ==
- HiSilicon
- Semiconductor industry in China
