= JCET (company) =

Chinese semiconductor company

JCET Group Co., Ltd.
- Trade name: JCET
- Native name: 江苏长电科技股份有限公司
- Company type: Public
- Traded as: SSE: 600584; CSI A100
- Industry: Semiconductor packaging and testing (OSAT)
- Founded: 1972; 54 years ago
- Headquarters: Jiangyin, Jiangsu, China
- Key people: Li Zheng (CEO)
- Revenue: ▼CN¥29.66 billion (2023)
- Net income: ▼CN¥1.47 billion (2023)
- Total assets: ▲CN¥42.58 billion (2023)
- Total equity: ▲CN¥26.15 billion (2023)
- Owner: China Resources Microelectronics
- Number of employees: 19,812 (2023)
- Website: jcetglobal.com

JCET Group is a publicly traded company headquartered in Jiangyin on China's eastern coast. It is the largest Outsourced Semiconductor Assembly and Test (OSAT) company in mainland China and the third-largest globally. JCET was formed in 1972, when Jiangyin converted a local factory to produce transistors. JCET went public on the Shanghai Stock Exchange in 2003 and continued to grow over time. JCET provides a range of semiconductor packaging, assembly, manufacturing, and testing products and services.

== History ==
JCET (Jiangsu Changjiang Electronics Technology) was founded in 1972, when the Jiangyin converted a factory into a facility for manufacturing transistors. The company's first automated manufacturing processes came online in 1986. JCET went public on the Shanghai Stock Exchange in June 2003. Later that year, it introduced several new products and subsidiaries, including the subsidiary JiangYin Changdian Advanced Packaging Co., Ltd. (JCAP) (later renamed as JCET Advanced Packaging Co.). JCAP works with Chinese universities on research and development in the semiconductor industry and became the largest wafer-level packaging company in China.

By 2004, JCET was manufacturing 2.5 billion integrated circuits and 15 billion transistor components annually. It opened a new research and development center in Singapore in 2007 and a new manufacturing facility in Jiangyin in 2008. From 2009 to 2013, JCET's revenues grew 17.8% per year. The company had US$611 million in annual revenue by 2011, which grew to $711 million by 2012. By 2015, JCET had five production centers in China and more than one billion USD in annual revenues.

In the 2000s, JCET's revenues decreased from more semiconductor companies bringing their packaging in-house, but later grew due to the increased demand for electronics.

JCET completed the acquisition of Singapore-based competitor STATS ChipPAC for $1.8 billion in August 2015. STATS ChipPAC was a competitor of JCET and the fourth-largest semiconductor packaging and testing company. The following year, JCET invested $300 million to double STATS ChipPAC's manufacturing capacity.

In March 2024, China Resources Microelectronics acquired a 22.5% stake in JCET making it the controlling shareholder.

== Products ==
JCET Group is the largest Outsourced Semiconductor Assembly and Test (OSAT) company in mainland China and the third-largest globally. JCET also provides semiconductor manufacturing, product development, testing, packaging design, and other services. As of 2019, it has six manufacturing facilities and two R&D centers. As of 2016, JCET holds about 2,600 patents.

== See also ==
- Huatian Technology
- Tongfu Microelectronics
- Semiconductor industry
- Semiconductor industry in China
- Integrated circuit packaging
- Wafer-level packaging
- System in a package
