= List of flash memory controller manufacturers =

This is a list of manufacturers of flash memory controllers for various flash memory devices like SSDs, USB flash drives, SD cards, and CompactFlash cards.

== List ==
Name	Based in	Status	Manufactures NVMe Controllers	Manufactures SATA Controllers	Manufactures CF & SD Controllers
Fusion-io; Acquired by SanDisk then Western Digital	United States	Captive	Yes	Yes	Yes
Greenliant Systems	United States	Independent	No	Yes	Yes
Hyperstone	Germany	Independent	No	Yes	Yes
Indilinx; Acquired by Toshiba then Kioxia	South Korea	Captive	Yes	Yes	No
Intel	United States	Captive	Yes	Yes	No
IntelliProp	United States	Independent	Yes	Yes	No
InnoGrit	China	Independent	Yes	Yes	Yes
JMicron, spun off into Maxiotek	Taiwan	Independent	Yes	Yes	Yes
Marvell	United States	Independent	Yes	Yes	No
Maxio	China	Independent	Yes	Yes	No
Micron	United States	Independent	Yes	Yes	Yes
Novachips	South Korea	Independent	Yes	Yes	No
Phison	Taiwan	Independent	Yes	Yes	Yes
Realtek	Taiwan	Independent	Yes	Yes	—N/a
Samsung	South Korea	Captive	Yes	Yes	Yes
SanDisk	United States	Captive	Yes	Yes	Yes
SK Hynix	South Korea	Captive	Yes	Yes	No
SandForce; Acquired by Seagate Technology	United States	Captive	Yes	Yes	No
Silicon Motion	Taiwan	Independent	Yes	Yes	Yes
Starblaze	China	Independent	Yes	No	No
sTec; Acquired by HGST then Western Digital	United States	Captive	Yes	Yes	No
Kioxia; Spun off from Toshiba	Japan	Captive	Yes	Yes	Yes
VIA Technologies	Taiwan	Captive	Yes	Yes	No
FADU	South Korea	Captive	Yes	No	No
Kraftway	Russia	Independent	Yes	No	No
DSOL	Russia	Independent	No	Yes	No

Note: Independent=sells to any 3rd party; Captive=only used for their own products

== Largest NAND flash memory manufacturers ==
The following were the largest NAND flash memory manufacturers, as of the third quarter of 2025.

1. Samsung Electronics – 30%
2. SK Hynix – 20%
3. Kioxia – 14%
4. Micron Technology – 13%
5. YMTC – 13%
6. Western Digital Corporation – 11%

Note: SK Hynix acquired Intel's NAND business at the end of 2021 Kioxia spun out and got renamed of Toshiba in 2018/2019.

Samsung remains the largest NAND flash memory manufacturer as of third quarter 2025.

== See also ==
- Flash memory
- History of hard disk drives
- List of defunct hard disk manufacturers
- List of DRAM manufacturers
- List of solid-state drive manufacturers
