= Zhao Weiguo =

Chinese businessman

- 赵伟国
- Born: 1967 (age 58–59); Shawan, Xinjiang, China
- Education: Tsinghua University
- Occupation: Businessman
- Known for: Former chairman of Tsinghua Unigroup
- Criminal charge(s): Embezzlement, illegal profit-seeking, breach of trust
- Criminal penalty: Suspended death sentence (two-year reprieve)
- Criminal status: Incarcerated

Zhao Weiguo (Chinese: 赵伟国; born 1967) is a Chinese businessman who served as chairman and chief executive of Tsinghua Unigroup, a state-backed semiconductor conglomerate affiliated with Tsinghua University, from 2009 until 2022. In May 2025, he was convicted of corruption and embezzlement and given a suspended death sentence by a court in Jilin Province.

== Early life and education ==
Zhao was born in 1967 in Shawan County, in northern Xinjiang, to parents who had been exiled to the region during the Anti-Rightist Campaign of 1957. He spent his childhood in a remote village during the Cultural Revolution, herding livestock and performing agricultural work. After the family was politically "rehabilitated" following the death of Mao Zedong in 1976, Zhao completed his secondary schooling in Shawan County and, in 1985, was admitted to the Department of Electronic Engineering at Tsinghua University in Beijing, where he later earned bachelor's and master's degrees.

== Career ==
=== Early career ===
After graduation, Zhao worked for an information technology firm in the Zhongguancun district of Beijing before returning to Tsinghua for graduate studies in 1993. On the recommendation of a professor, he joined Tsinghua Tongfang, a subsidiary of Tsinghua Holdings, in the late 1990s, where he oversaw mergers and acquisitions including the purchase of a state-owned satellite technology supplier. In 2004, following Tongfang's acquisition of Xinjiang Gas Group, Zhao was appointed chairman of that company and relocated to Xinjiang. While based in the region, he built a fortune in real estate amid a local property boom, forming a joint venture that later became Beijing Jiankun Real Estate and, subsequently, Beijing Jiankun Investment Group.

=== Tsinghua Unigroup ===
In 2009, Zhao's Beijing Jiankun Investment Group acquired a stake in Tsinghua Unigroup, eventually holding 49 percent to Tsinghua Holdings's 51 percent, and Zhao was appointed president and chief executive. He became chairman in 2013. Under Zhao, Unigroup shifted its focus from consumer electronics and pharmaceuticals to the semiconductor industry, a pivot that preceded Beijing's 2014 National Integrated Circuit plan and the creation of the China Integrated Circuit Industry Investment Fund ("Big Fund").

In April 2018, Zhao accompanied Chinese leader Xi Jinping on a tour of a semiconductor facility in Wuhan, a widely publicised event that positioned him as a leading figure in the country's chip campaign. Also in April 2018, Zhao resigned as chairman of Unigroup subsidiaries Unisplendour Corporation and Unigroup Guoxin, citing his workload at the parent group.

At the peak of his career, Zhao was one of China's wealthiest individuals, ranking 1,096th on the Forbes World's Billionaires list in 2022 with an estimated net worth of US$2.8 billion. He publicly pledged to donate 70 percent of his personal assets to Tsinghua University.

=== Debt crisis and removal ===
Beginning in late 2020, Tsinghua Unigroup defaulted on a series of onshore and offshore bonds, including US$198 million in bonds in November 2020, as its debt burden overwhelmed the group. In July 2021, following a petition by creditor Huishang Bank, a Beijing court accepted the company for court-led bankruptcy reorganization. A consortium led by Wise Road Capital and Jianguang Asset Management (JAC Capital) was selected as investor. Zhao publicly opposed the restructuring through his Jiankun holding vehicle, arguing that it would result in a loss of state assets valued at CNY 73.4 billion (US$11.5 billion) and that the group faced a liquidity crisis rather than insolvency. The restructuring was formally approved in December 2021, and in July 2022 full ownership of Tsinghua Unigroup was transferred to Beijing Zhiguangxin Holding, with both Tsinghua Holdings and Jiankun exiting.

=== Investigation, trial and, conviction ===
In July 2022, shortly after Unigroup's restructuring, Zhao was taken from his home in Beijing by Chinese authorities and placed under investigation by the National Supervisory Commission. His case was part of a wider anti-corruption campaign targeting executives of the Big Fund, Sino IC Capital and other bodies charged with executing China's semiconductor policy.

In March 2023, the Central Commission for Discipline Inspection announced that Zhao was suspected of embezzlement, illegal profit-seeking for relatives and friends, and damaging the interests of a listed company, and that his case had been transferred to prosecutors. He stood trial before the Intermediate People's Court of Jilin Province in September 2023.

On 14 May 2025, the court convicted Zhao and sentenced him to death with a two-year reprieve, a sentence that under Chinese law is customarily commuted to life imprisonment after two years without further offence. He was also fined CNY 12 million (US$1.67 million), and all of his personal property was ordered confiscated. The court found that between 2014 and 2021 Zhao had illegally obtained more than CNY 470 million (US$65 million) in state assets, caused state losses exceeding CNY 890 million, and caused losses of more than CNY 46 million to a listed subsidiary, resulting in total losses to state interests of approximately CNY 1.4 billion (US$194 million). The court noted that the reprieve was granted because Zhao had surrendered himself, returned illicit gains and shown remorse.
