= XMC =

XMC may refer to:

- Cessna XMC, a technology demonstrator aircraft
- Infineon XMC, a series of microcontrollers
- Makhuwa-Marrevone language, a Bantu language of Mozambique
- Mallacoota Airport, a public airport in Mallacoota, Victoria, Australia
- XBMC, a media player application originally known as Xbox Media Center
- XMC (company), Chinese semiconductor integrated device manufacturer.
- XMC Mezzanine Card, a type of PCI Mezzanine Card
