= List of DRAM manufacturers =

List of dynamic random-access memory manufacturers

This is a list of DRAM manufacturers and suppliers of dynamic random-access memory integrated circuits. It includes companies that manufacture or market DRAM chips used in DDR SDRAM, LPDDR, GDDR, HBM, and specialty or legacy memory products. Companies that only assemble memory modules from third-party DRAM chips are not included.

== Current manufacturers and suppliers ==
Name	Based in	Type	Commodity DRAM	Low-power DRAM	Graphics / HBM DRAM	Notes
ChangXin Memory Technologies	China	IDM	Yes	Yes	No	Chinese DRAM manufacturer; products include DDR and LPDDR memory.
Elite Semiconductor Microelectronics Technology (ESMT)	Taiwan	Fabless / specialty supplier	Yes	Yes	No	Supplies specialty DRAM, including DDR and low-power mobile DRAM products.
Etron Technology	Taiwan	Fabless / specialty supplier	Yes	Yes	No	Supplies legacy and value-added DRAM products for form-factor-driven applications, including mobile and wearable markets.
Integrated Silicon Solution Inc. (ISSI)	United States	Fabless / specialty supplier	Yes	Yes	No	Supplies DRAM and mobile DRAM for long-lifecycle embedded, automotive, industrial, and communications markets.
Micron Technology	United States	Merchant IDM	Yes	Yes	Yes	One of the three largest DRAM suppliers.
Nanya Technology	Taiwan	Merchant IDM	Yes	Yes	No	Supplies standard and low-power DRAM, including DDR4, DDR5, LPDDR4, and LPDDR5 products.
Powerchip Semiconductor Manufacturing Corporation	Taiwan	Foundry / IDM	Yes	Yes	No	Provides DRAM foundry services and produces consumer DRAM products.
Samsung Electronics	South Korea	Merchant IDM	Yes	Yes	Yes	One of the three largest DRAM suppliers.
SK Hynix	South Korea	Merchant IDM	Yes	Yes	Yes	One of the three largest DRAM suppliers and a major HBM supplier.
Winbond	Taiwan	Merchant IDM / specialty supplier	Yes	Yes	No	Supplies specialty and mobile DRAM for embedded, industrial, automotive, and consumer applications.

Note: IDM means an integrated device manufacturer that designs and manufactures chips. Fabless / specialty supplier means a company that designs or markets DRAM products while relying partly or wholly on external wafer fabrication.

== Former manufacturers ==
Name	Based in	Fate
Elpida Memory	Japan	Acquired by Micron Technology.
Inotera	Taiwan	Acquired by Micron Technology.
ProMOS Technologies	Taiwan	Former DRAM manufacturer; creditors sought sale of its 12-inch wafer plant during restructuring.
Qimonda	Germany	Former memory-chip manufacturer spun off from Infineon Technologies; filed for insolvency in 2009.
Texas Instruments memory business	United States	Sold its DRAM memory business to Micron Technology in 1998.

== Largest DRAM manufacturers ==
The following were the largest DRAM manufacturers by revenue market share in the first quarter of 2026, according to Counterpoint Research.

1. Samsung Electronics – 38%
2. SK Hynix – 29%
3. Micron Technology – 22%
4. ChangXin Memory Technologies – 8%
5. Nanya Technology – 2%
6. Other manufacturers – 1%

Note: Percentages may not add to 100 due to rounding.

== Largest HBM manufacturers ==
High Bandwidth Memory (HBM) is a type of DRAM used with graphics processors, AI accelerators, and other high-performance computing devices. The following were the largest HBM manufacturers by revenue market share in the first quarter of 2026, according to Counterpoint Research.

1. SK Hynix – 58%
2. Samsung Electronics – 21%
3. Micron Technology – 21%

== See also ==
- 2025–present global memory supply shortage
- Synchronous dynamic random-access memory
- DDR5 SDRAM
- List of computer hardware manufacturers
- List of defunct hard disk manufacturers
- List of flash memory controller manufacturers
- List of integrated circuit manufacturers
- List of semiconductor fabrication plants
- List of solid-state drive manufacturers
- Semiconductor industry
- Wafer-scale integrated circuit
