= Guoxin Micro =

Chinese Semiconductor Company

Unigroup Guoxin Microelectronics Co., Ltd.
- Trade name: Guoxin Micro
- Native name: 紫光国芯微电子股份有限公司
- Formerly: Tongfang Guoxin Electronics
- Type: Public; State-owned enterprise
- Traded as: SZSE: 002049; CSI A100
- Industry: Semiconductors
- Predecessor: Tangshan Jingyuan Yufeng Electronics
- Founded: 17 August 2001; 24 years ago
- Headquarters: Tangshan, Hebei, China
- Key people: Ma Daojie (chairman & CEO)
- Revenue: ▲CN¥7.57 billion (2023)
- Net income: ▲CN¥2.53 billion (2023)
- Total assets: ▲CN¥17.53 billion (2023)
- Total equity: ▲CN¥11.73 billion (2023)
- Number of employees: 2,543 (2023)
- Parent: Tsinghua Unigroup
- Website: www.gosinoic.com

Unigroup Guoxin Microelectronics Co., Ltd. (Guoxin Micro; Chinese: 紫光国微; pinyin: Zǐguāng Guówēi) is a partially state-owned publicly listed Chinese semiconductor company headquartered in Tangshan, Hebei. Its main businesses are in integrated circuit chip designs, intelligent security chips, and power semiconductor devices. It is estimated that in 2022, Guoxin Micro's estimated global share in SIM card chips tops 20%.

Guoxin Micro is a subsidiary of Tsinghua Unigroup.

== Background ==
The predecessor of Guoxin Micro was Tangshan Jingyuan Yufeng Electronics which was established in 1991. In August 2001, it completed its restructuring to become a joint-stock company.

In June 2005, Jingyuan Electronics held its initial public offering become a listed company on the Shenzhen Stock Exchange.

In June 2010, Tsinghua Tongfang acquired a 25% stake of Jingyuan Electronics making it the largest shareholder. This was done to provide more support to Jingyuan Electronics to upgrade its technology. Later on Tongfang became the controlling shareholder through a stock swap making Jingyuan part of the Tsinghua Holdings group.

In July 2012, Jingyuan Electronics was officially renamed to Tongfang Guoxin Electronics.

In November 2015, Tsinghua Unigroup stated it would buy a 36.4% stake in Tongfang Guoxin and become its controlling shareholder. Tongfang Guoxin also planned an 80 billion yuan private placement but this was later suspended. Tongfang Guoxin was later renamed to Unigroup Guoxin.

In April 2018, Unigroup Guoxin was renamed to Unigroup Guoxin Microelectronics. In September 2018, Tsinghua Holdings sold further shares of Guoxin Micro to Tsinghua Unigroup which gave Tsinghua Unigroup a 51% stake.

== See also ==
- Semiconductor industry in China
- Tsinghua Unigroup
