= Nuctech Company =

Chinese security products company

Nuctech Company, Ltd
- Native name: 同方威视技术股份有限公司
- Formerly: Nuclear Technology Company
- Company type: Partially state-owned enterprise
- Industry: Security, Inspection
- Founded: 1997; 29 years ago
- Founder: Kang Kejun, Chen Zhiqiang
- Headquarters: Beijing, China
- Key people: Zhiqiang Chen (President, Chairman and CEO)
- Products: Cargo scanning, metal detector, X-ray, puffer machine
- Parent: Tsinghua Tongfang
- Website: www.nuctech.com

Nuctech Company Limited
- Simplified Chinese: 同方威视技术股份有限公司
- Traditional Chinese: 同方威視技術股份有限公司
Transcriptions
Standard Mandarin
- Hanyu Pinyin: Tóng Fāng Wēi Shì Jìshù Gǔfènyǒuxiàngōngsī

Nuctech Company, Ltd is a Chinese partially state-owned security inspection products company, headquartered in Beijing, created in 1997 as an offshoot of Tsinghua University. Nuctech Company's parent company, Tsinghua Tongfang, is controlled by the China National Nuclear Corporation, a state-owned company that manages China's civilian and military nuclear fuel development program. Several countries have raised concerns about contracts for security scanning equipment due to the company's partial state ownership and ties to the Chinese Communist Party and Chinese military.

== History ==
Nuctech Company was founded in 1997 in Beijing as Nuctech Co, Ltd. by several professors from Tsinghua University who wanted to commercialize results of their research in container inspection technology. In 1999, the company sold inspection systems to Chinese customs and in 2001 signed its first international contracts with Australia and the United Arab Emirates. In 2006, the company won a contract to install scanners to detect dangerous liquids in a total of 147 airports across China. In 2015, the company opened a factory in Brazil. In 2018, Nuctech opened a factory in Kobyłka, a town near Warsaw. In 2016, Nuctech formed a subsidiary, FoundMacro, to serve the defense sector.

The company's x-ray scanners and other security equipment were used at the 2014 World Cup and the 2016 Olympic Games and 2016 Paralympic Games in Brazil and other large public events including the 2015 Milan Expo, the 2015 Wimbledon tennis tournament, and the 2018 Summit of the Americas.

In April 2024, European Commission authorities raided the offices of Nuctech in Poland and the Netherlands as part of an investigation into breaches of the EU Foreign Subsidies Regulation. Nuctech subsequently lost its legal challenge in the General Court over the raids. Nuctech appealed the ruling in the European Court of Justice and lost in March 2025. In December 2025, the European Commission announced that it deepened its probe into Nuctech.

== Ownership and management ==
Nuctech is a subsidiary of Tsinghua Tongfang, which is publicly traded on the Shanghai Stock Exchange. Tsinghua Tongfang owns two thirds of Nuctech's shares. In 2019, the China National Nuclear Corporation, a state-owned company that manages China's civilian and military nuclear fuel development program, bought a 21 percent stake in Tsinghua Tongfang. The company has stated that CNNC owns 16 percent of Nuctech shares through Tsinghua Tongfang. In April 2021, a Nuctech spokesperson stated that "the Chinese government does not control the company or its management decisions."

Executive directors and chairmen of the company have included Hu Haifeng, son of former General Secretary of the Chinese Communist Party Hu Jintao, from 2003 until 2008, Rong Yonglin, and Zhou Liye. The current chairman is Chen Zhiqiang.

According to a 2022 report by the Associated Press, "Nuctech's ownership structure is so complex that can be difficult for outsiders to understand the true lines of influence and accountability."

== Products and services ==
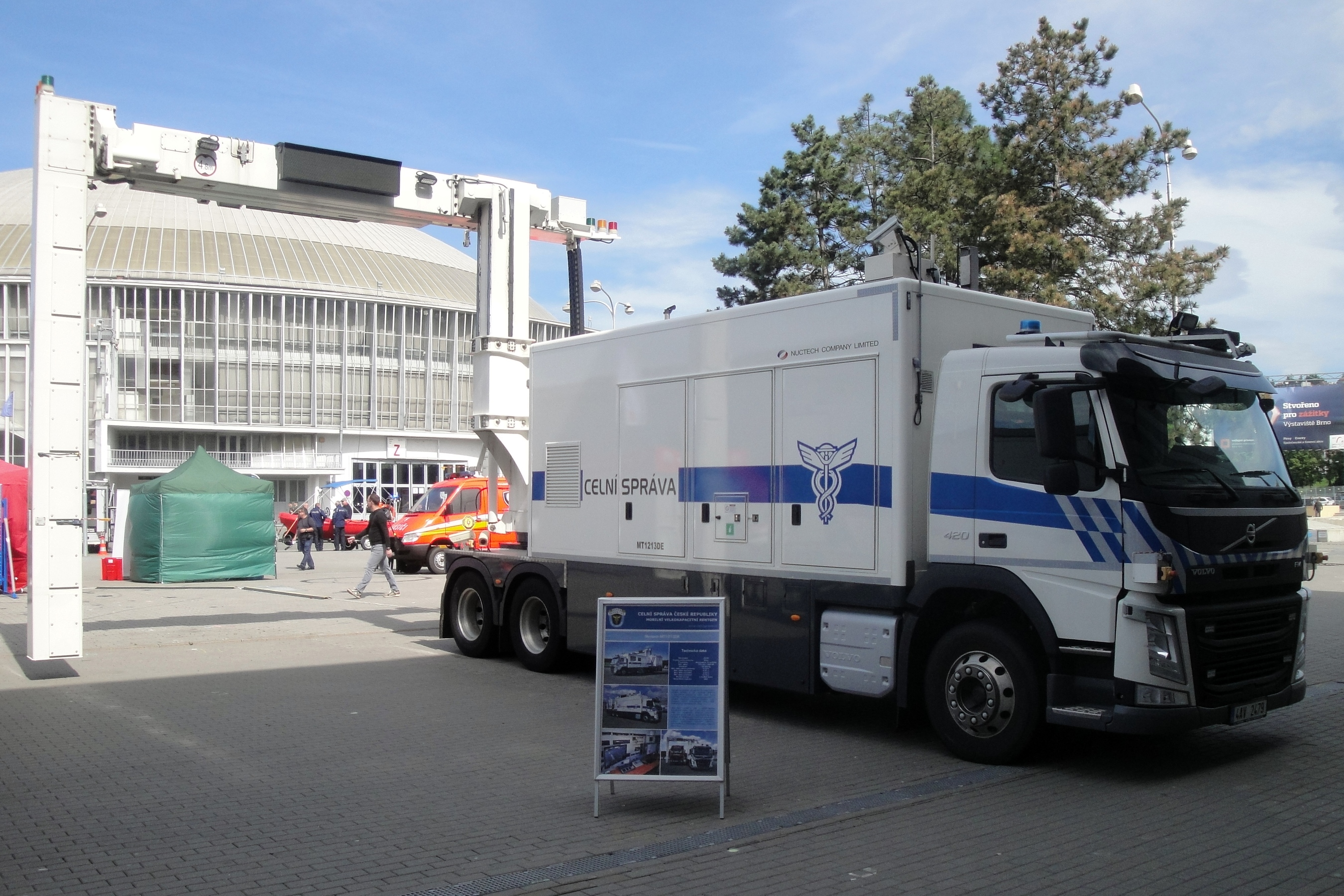
Nuctech X-ray scanner truck

Nuctech Company manufactures security inspection products, including scanners for baggage and parcel inspection, cargo and vehicle inspection, personnel inspection, and fever screening technology. Nuctech's products are used in civil aviation, customs inspection, railway inspection, highway freight inspection, building security and large event security. In the United States, Nuctech body scanners are also used to detect contraband in prisons.

Nuctech security equipment is in use at airports across Europe, including in Spain, Italy, Cyprus and the United Kingdom and by customs and border agencies in Ireland and Finland. The company also reported contracts in countries including Syria, Australia, Turkey, Iran, Belgium, Venezuela, Zimbabwe, Norway and South Korea.

== Criticism ==
Nuctech Company has been criticized for its practices and mentioned in a number of media reports in relation to controversies.

=== Data security ===
The company's ties to the Chinese Communist Party and CNNC have raised concerns from some countries about data security, including Canada and Lithuania. In 2020, customs authorities in Finland stated that they found no security grounds to reject a bid by Nuctech. In 2021, Nuctech responded to a decision by Lithuania to eliminate it in a tender for national security reasons by stating that it has not had any data or security incident reported by customers and that the company "fully complied with Lithuanian, Polish and EU laws and regulations, not to the laws of any third country, including China". A Lithuanian special governmental commission that vets deals for national security impact on August 12, 2021, approved the purchase and installation of Nuctech X-ray equipment at the Belarusian border.

In 2022, several members of the European Parliament issued a letter challenging a tender to award Nuctech for scanners in the Strasbourg Airport due to security concerns.

=== Procurement investigation in the Philippines ===
In 2006, the Philippine government bought 30 units of mobile X-ray equipment through a loan agreement with the Chinese government for a total value of P7.953 billion. In 2016, it was reported that the Commission on Audit of the Philippines (COA) found that the contract had been "exorbitantly overpriced," that a much lower quotation existed from another supplier, and that maintenance costs were higher for Nuctech products. COA auditors clarified that the price inquiry was made despite the difficulty in providing an accurate unit price and full specifications of Nuctech's machines. The COA asked the Bureau of Customs to review the original contract and evaluate the deal.

=== Anti-dumping dispute ===
In July 2009, it was reported that Nuctech was accused of "illegal dumping" by Smiths Group and that an anti-dumping investigation by the European Union (EU) was ongoing. In June 2010, the EU imposed a five-year tariff on Nuctech products for alleged dumping on the European market. The anti-dumping measures expired in the absence of an extension request. In response to the ruling, the company shifted production to a factory outside Warsaw, Poland.

=== Bribery scandal in Namibia ===
On July 21, 2009, a Nuctech representative and two Namibians were arrested after the Anti-Corruption Commission of Namibia (ACC) discovered that a US$12.8 million down payment on 13 scanners had been diverted to a firm called Teko Trading. Namibian prosecutors charged the three with joining in a bribery scheme that secured a $55.3 million contract in May 2008 to install Nuctech scanners at customs inspection points across Namibia. Other sources report the contract to be worth $69 million. General Martin Shalli was subsequently suspended by Namibian president Hifikepunye Pohamba for allegedly receiving millions of Namibian dollars from Nuctech. In 2019, those arrested and charged were acquitted in court.

=== Bribery scandal in Taiwan ===
In February 2020, Taipei Times reported Taiwan's former head of the Aviation Police Bureau's aviation security section was found guilty on corruption charges in relation to a procurement project involving Nuctech.

=== Canadian embassies contract rejected ===
In July 2020, Canada's foreign affairs minister stated that he would review contracts awarded by the Canada Border Services Agency in light of Nuctech's connections to the Chinese Communist Party. After hiring Deloitte to undertake a security review, the Canadian government decided to reject a $6.8 million deal with Nuctech. In September 2020, Global News reported that the Canadian International Trade Tribunal was reviewing the procurement of the contract.

=== Quality and procurement concerns in Malaysia ===
According to a July 2020 report by Malaysiakini, the National Audit Department and the Royal Malaysian Customs Department have both cited quality and procurement concerns with Nuctech products.

=== U.S. ban and sanctions ===
In 2014, the Transportation Security Administration banned Nuctech equipment from U.S. airports due to security concerns. In December 2020, the United States Department of Commerce added Nuctech to the Bureau of Industry and Security's Entity List.
