= Fujian Jinhua Integrated Circuit =

Chinese state-owned DRAM manufacturer

Fujian Jinhua Integrated Circuit Co. Ltd.
- Native name: 福建省晋华集成电路有限公司
- Romanized name: Fújiànshěng Jìnhuá Jíchéng Diànlù Yǒuxiàn Gōngsī
- Type: State-owned
- Industry: Semiconductors
- Founded: February 2016
- Headquarters: Fujian, China
- Products: DRAM and related products
- Website: www.jhicc.com

Fujian Jinhua Integrated Circuit Co. Ltd., or JHICC (Chinese: 晋华集成电路; pinyin: jìnhuá jíchéng diànlù), is a Chinese state-owned DRAM manufacturer based in Fujian, China. It is part of the Made in China 2025 program, a component of China's strategy to gain self-sufficiency in the semiconductor industry, and is a national leader in China's technology industry.

== History ==
Fujian Jinhua is a Chinese state-owned company, founded in February 2016, with an investment of US$5.6 billion from the Chinese national government and Fujian provincial government. Its management, as reported by China Daily, said that its goal is to "fill the gap in the domestic market by producing integrated circuit products for mobile phone manufacturers in the country." It was part of the Chinese government's plan to reach 70% self-sufficiency in semiconductors by the year 2025, and not be reliant on countries like South Korea.

Fujian Jinhua was to concentrate on DRAM development, along with ChangXin Memory Technologies, previously known as Innotron. Fujian Jinhua planned to develop its production capacity for DRAM chips in servers, in cooperation with Taiwan-based United Microelectronics Corporation (UMC). Fujian Jinhua's production facility is in Jinjiang, Fujian. It was expected to be China's largest single integrated circuit manufacturing facility and have its first phase completed in September 2018. Fujian Jinhua planned to produce products worth $6 billion each year.

Along with other state-backed chip companies like Yangtze Memory Technologies Co. and Changxin, Fujian Jinhua was seen as crucial for China's self-sufficiency in the semiconductor industry.

== U.S. government sanctions ==
In October 2018, the U.S. placed Fujian Jinhua on the Bureau of Industry and Security's Entity List, meaning that it cannot buy goods with components, software, or technology from American firms. The move took place in the midst of the U.S.-China Trade War. The Trump administration alleged that Fujian Jinhua could flood the market with cheap chips and bankrupt American firms that supply the U.S. military, and was therefore a national security threat. China asserted that the move violated World Trade Organization rules on trade and was aimed at protecting a U.S. monopoly.

== Micron lawsuits ==
Micron Technology, a U.S. memory chip maker, accused Fujian Jinhua and UMC of stealing chip designs. It accused UMC of hiring Micron employees, stealing its trade secrets, and transferring them to Fujian Jinhua. Fujian Jinhua countersued in China, successfully convincing a Chinese court to ban some of Micron's chips in China.

In November 2018, the U.S. Department of Justice announced an indictment against Fujian Jinhua and Taiwanese company UMC, alleging that they conspired to steal intellectual property from Micron. The indictment was originally filed in September 2018. The U.S. government sees the case of Fujian Jinhua as part of a broader pattern of IP theft. The firm plead not guilty in January 2019. After U.S. sanctions, UMC said it suspended its partnership with Jinhua, and by early 2019, 200 of 300 UMC engineers sent to Fujian Jinhua returned to Taiwan. Media reports suggested that Fujian Jinhua ceased production in March 2019.

In October 2020, UMC pleaded guilty to one count of receiving and possessing a stolen trade-secret, and agreed to pay a US$60 million fine, in exchange for cooperating with the DOJ.

On February 27, 2024, US District Judge Maxine M. Chesney in San Francisco acquitted Fujian Jinhua of the charge in a non-jury verdict, judging that the prosecutor failed to provide sufficient evidence to support the charge.
