= Piotech =

Chinese semiconductor equipment manufacturer

Piotech Inc.
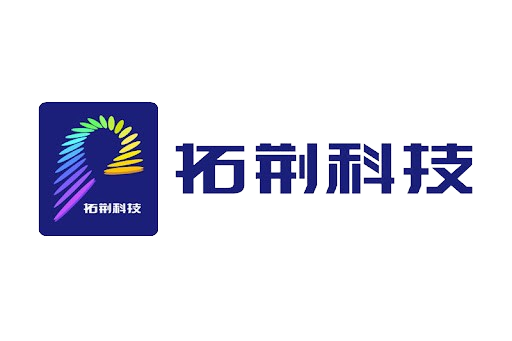
- Native name: 拓荆科技股份有限公司
- Company type: Public; partly state-owned
- Traded as: SSE: 688072
- Industry: Semiconductors
- Founded: 28 April 2010; 16 years ago
- Headquarters: Shenyang, Liaoning, China
- Key people: Lü Guangquan (Chairman); Liu Jing (CEO)
- Revenue: ▲CN¥2.71 billion (2023)
- Net income: ▲CN¥663.88 million (2023)
- Total assets: ▲CN¥9.97 billion (2023)
- Total equity: ▲CN¥4.59 billion (2023)
- Number of employees: 1,068 (2023)
- Website: www.piotech.cn

Piotech (also known as Tuojing Technology; Chinese: 拓荆科技; pinyin: Tàjīng Kējì) is a publicly listed Chinese company that manufactures semiconductor chip production equipment.

== Background ==
In April 2010, Piotech was founded by a group of returning international technology veterans from the United States along with the Chinese Academy of Sciences.

In 2015, Piotech announced that it had received a 270 billion yuan investment from a group that included the China Integrated Circuit Industry Investment Fund and Advanced Micro-Fabrication Equipment. The China Integrated Circuit Industry Investment Fund currently remains the largest shareholder of the company.

According to Piotech's initial public offering (IPO) prospectus in 2021, it has three products lines which are developing equipment for plasma-enhanced chemical vapor deposition (PECVD), atomic layer deposition (ALD) and sub-atmospheric pressure chemical vapor deposition (SACVD). The company's products were used in 14 nm process and above. It had also carried out testing in 10 nm process and below. Its customers included SMIC, Hua Hong Semiconductor, Yangtze Memory Technologies and ChangXin Memory Technologies.

On 20 April 2022, Piotech completed its IPO becoming a listed company on the Shanghai Stock Exchange STAR Market.

In July 2022, Piotech shares surged 10% after news reported that the United States was pushing the Netherlands to ban ASML Holding from selling certain technology to China to manufacture chips.

It was speculated that the United States New Export Controls on Advanced Computing and Semiconductors to China that was effective 7 October 2022 would have an impact on Piotech. According to a filing in early 2022, six of the seven key research and development executives of Piotech were American citizens. Many of its top management including chairman and general manager were also Americans.

In March 2024, Piotech stated its plan to invest 1.1 billion yuan in a high-end semiconductor equipment industrialization base construction project.

In December 2024, Piotech was targeted in a new round of US export controls and added to the United States Department of Commerce's Entity List.

== See also ==
- Semiconductor industry in China
