= OCZ =

Former American computer hardware manufacturer

OCZ Storage Solutions
- Formerly: OCZ Technology (2002-2014)
- Type: Subsidiary of Toshiba
- Traded as: OTC Pink: OCZTQ; Nasdaq: OCZ
- Industry: Computer
- Predecessors: Indilinx
- Founded: August 2002; 24 years ago
- Founders: Ryan Petersen; Bhulinder Sethi
- Defunct: April 1, 2016; 10 years ago
- Fate: Dissolved and absorbed into Toshiba, then spun off into Kioxia
- Successors: Toshiba; Kioxia
- Headquarters: San Jose, California, United States
- Key people: Ralph Schmitt (CEO)
- Products: Solid-state drives Random Access Memory
- Number of employees: 550 (April 24, 2013)
- Parent: Kioxia
- Subsidiaries: Indilinx
- Website: ocz.com

OCZ was a brand of Toshiba that was used for some of its solid-state drives (SSDs) before they were rebranded with Toshiba. OCZ Storage Solutions was a manufacturer of SSDs based in San Jose, California, USA and was the new company formed after the sale of OCZ Technology Group's SSD assets to Toshiba Corporation. Since entering the memory market as OCZ Technology in 2002, the company has targeted its products primarily at the computer hardware enthusiast market, producing performance DDR SDRAM, video cards, USB drives, power supply units, and various cooling products.

OCZ Storage Solutions was dissolved on April 1, 2016 and absorbed into Toshiba America Electronic Components, Inc, which later then became Kioxia.

== History ==
OCZ Technology logo (2002-2014)

OCZ was originally called "The Overclockerz Store" when it was founded by Ryan Petersen in 2000 selling overclocked Athlon processors. San Jose, California-based OCZ Technology Group, Inc. was founded in 2002 by Ryan Petersen and Bhulinder Sethi.

OCZ maintained satellite offices in The Netherlands, United Kingdom, and Israel along with manufacturing and logistics facilities in Taiwan. In June 2006, OCZ went public on the London Stock Exchange Alternative Investment Market (LSE AIM), with the ticker symbol "OCZ". On May 25, 2007, OCZ acquired PC Power & Cooling, whose products include power supplies. PC Power & Cooling is in Carlsbad, California. It operated as a separate satellite office for OCZ and maintained its own product lines, although OCZ later launched OCZ-branded power supply models as well. In early March 2009, OCZ announced their intent to delist from the LSE to pursue a listing on an American stock exchange. On April 24, 2010, OCZ announced a listing on NASDAQ with the ticker symbol "OCZ".

In September 2010 OCZ announced the RevoDrive, which is a bootable PCI-E drive for the enthusiast market. It also recently announced an SSD interface called High Speed Data Link (HSDL), which is a PCIe/SAS hybrid interface, along with corresponding products to implement it. As of 2012, OCZ's SSDs offered up to a 1 TB capacity.

In November 2010, OCZ acquired intellectual property from Solid Data Inc., for Fibre Channel, SAS, and controller assets for solid state drives. The cost was approximately $950,000, paid with restricted common stock and cash.

OCZ discontinued all RAM production, citing poor market performance and the weakening global DRAM market, by the end of their 2010 fiscal year on February 28, 2011.

In March 2011, OCZ acquired Indilinx Company, Limited, a privately held fabless provider of flash controller silicon and software for SSDs, for approximately $32 million of OCZ common stock.

On October 5, 2011, OCZ announced an intent to acquire PLX Technology's Abingdon R&D department (formerly Oxford Semiconductor), which specializes in storage SoC development.

In 2012 OCZ acquired Sanrad Inc., a privately held provider of flash caching and virtualization software and hardware from the RAD Group; Sanrad became the OCZ Israel office. Reports in 2012 indicated that a possible acquisition of OCZ by Seagate Technology fell through. On September 17, 2012, founder and CEO Ryan Petersen was fired by his board of directors, and chief marketing officer Alex Mei was appointed as interim CEO. Media outlets speculated that Ryan was ousted by the board of directors.

In the early 2010s, SSD devices with the OCZ brand that use SATA III, PCI Express, Serial attached SCSI and USB 3.0 interfaces, for both client and enterprise applications were produced and marketed. OCZ-branded power supply units were also manufactured.

On October 10, 2012, OCZ appointed board member Ralph Schmitt as the company's president and CEO. Schmitt joined OCZ from PLX, where he served as president and CEO since 2008.

=== Accounting practices ===
Several shareholder lawsuits revolved around questionable accounting practices during 2012. In May 2013 the NASDAQ gave OCZ until September 16, 2013 to file its delayed earnings. The company was several quarters late in filing and restated earnings back to 2008.

On September 12, 2013, the company disclosed it would not meet the deadline, which was then extended to October 7.

2013 saw OCZ's revenue fall steeply from $88.6 million in the second fiscal quarter of 2012 to $33.5 million in the second fiscal quarter of 2013, while financial losses increased. OCZ took a $30 million loan at a steep 15% interest rate from Hercules Technology Growth Capital. Because OCZ put in their own firm as collateral for the loan, Hercules Technology Growth Capital would gain ownership of OCZ if OCZ failed to repay the loan.

After failing to meet the term of the loan, it was extended to June 2014, with the share price dropping 40% on November 4, 2013. On November 25, 2013, Hercules took control of OCZ's bank accounts because it was not in compliance with the conditions of the loan.

The Securities and Exchange Commission charged former CEO Ryan Petersen and former CFO Arthur Knap for accounting failures. In a complaint filed in the Northern District of California, the SEC alleged that OCZ's former CEO Ryan Petersen engaged in a scheme to materially inflate OCZ's revenues and gross margins from 2010 to 2012. It separately charged OCZ's former chief financial officer Arthur Knapp for certain accounting, disclosure, and internal accounting controls failures at OCZ. Knapp agreed to settle the SEC's charges without admitting the allegations against him. As of 2015, the SEC's litigation continued against Petersen, and finally came to a close in 2017.

=== Toshiba acquisition ===
On November 27, 2013, OCZ Technology stock was halted. OCZ then stated they expected to file a petition for bankruptcy and that Toshiba Corporation had expressed interest in purchasing its assets in a bankruptcy proceeding. On December 2, 2013, OCZ announced Toshiba had agreed to purchase nearly all of OCZ's assets for $35 million. The deal was completed on January 21, 2014 when the assets of OCZ Technology Group became a new independently operated subsidiary of Toshiba named OCZ Storage Solutions. OCZ Technology Group then changed its name to ZCO Liquidating Corporation; on August 18, 2014, ZCO Liquidating Corporation and its subsidiaries were liquidated.

In February 2014, the PC Power & Cooling subsidiary was sold to FirePower Technology.

OCZ Storage Solutions was dissolved on April 1, 2016 and absorbed into Toshiba America Electronic Components, Inc., with OCZ becoming a brand of Toshiba. Toshiba later reorganized its memory products division under a new company and brand, Kioxia.

== Reliability history ==
OCZ-branded SSDs were notable for high failure rates. Two lines from the old OCZ Technology Group, the Petrol and the SATA II versions of the Octane, had return rates of over 40% at one anonymous French technology online retailer. The SATA II version of the 128 GB Octane had a return rate of 52.07%. No other company had any SSDs with a return rate of over 5% from this retailer in the data set that was published on March 5, 2013. In a dataset published on April 30, 2014, OCZ again had the highest return rates from the same anonymous retailer. The next dataset, published on November 6, 2014, shows only one OCZ drive, the OCZ Agility 3 480 GB, which had a much lower return rate of 1.34%.

KitGuru tested five samples of the OCZ ARC100 240GB SSD, which was released after Toshiba acquired OCZ's assets, over four months in 2014 and 2015. The drives were deliberately tested to destruction; the lowest lifetime throughput was 350TB and the highest 700TB. The drive's warranty covers 20GB of data transfer a day for three years, a total of 22TB.
