= Unisplendour =

Chinese IT Company

Unisplendour Corporation Limited
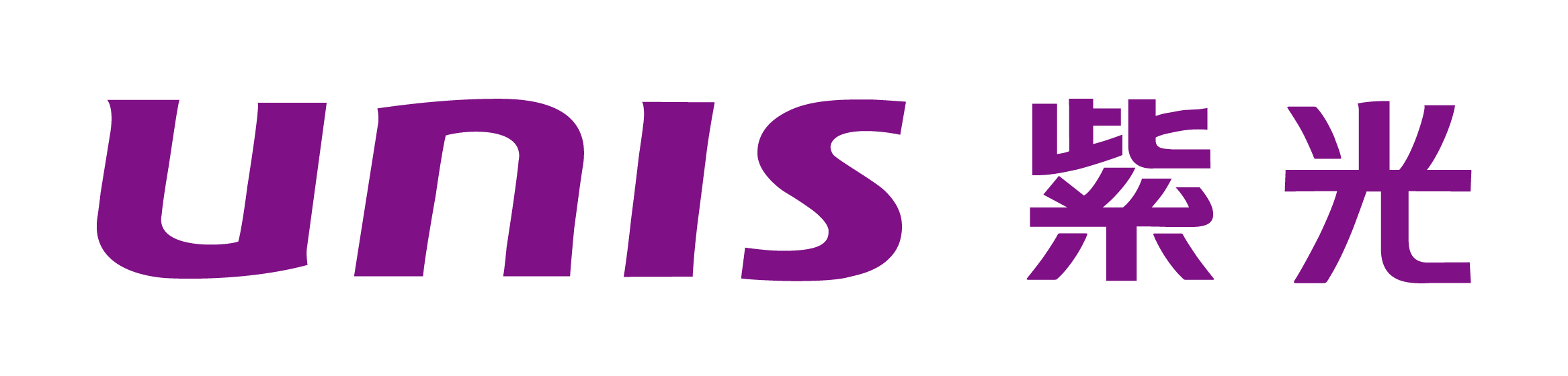
- Trade name: UNIS
- Native name: 紫光股份有限公司
- Company type: Public; State-owned enterprise
- Traded as: SZSE: 000938; CSI A50
- Industry: Information technology
- Founded: 18 March 1999; 27 years ago
- Headquarters: Beijing, China
- Key people: Yu Yingtao (chairman); Wang Hongtao (president)
- Revenue: ▲CN¥77.31 billion (2023)
- Net income: ▼CN¥3.69 billion (2023)
- Total assets: ▲CN¥87.27 billion (2023)
- Total equity: ▲CN¥40.04 billion (2023)
- Number of employees: 19,186 (2023)
- Parent: Tsinghua Unigroup
- Subsidiaries: H3C; UNIS WDC
- Website: www.thunis.com

Unisplendour Corporation Limited (UNIS; Chinese: 紫光股份; pinyin: Zǐguāng Gǔfèn) is a partially state-owned publicly listed Chinese information technology company headquartered in Beijing.

UNIS acts as the listed arm of Tsinghua Unigroup.

== Background ==
In March 1999, Tsinghua Unigroup established UNIS. In November 1999, UNIS held its initial public offering becoming a listed company on the Shenzhen Stock Exchange.

During its early years, UNIS operated at low profitability and suffered losses in 2001 and 2005. Its main business line of IT distribution had low profit margins.

In May 2015, UNIS acquired a 51% stake in H3C for $2.3 billion. It was Hewlett-Packard's Chinese server, storage and technology business. H3C significantly increased the profitability of UNIS.

In September 2015, UNIS agreed to pay $3.78 billion for a 15% stake in Western Digital. However, in February 2016, Unisplendour announced it would not move forward with its offer following a decision by the Committee on Foreign Investment in the United States (CFIUS) to investigate the deal. Instead in September 2016, UNIS formed a joint venture with Western Digital named UNIS WDC.

In May 2024, Hewlett Packard Enterprise announced that UNIS would acquire a further 30% stake in H3C for $2.1 billion.

In February 2025, it was reported that UNIS would seek a secondary listing on the Hong Kong Stock Exchange.

== See also ==
- Tsinghua Unigroup
