= ChangXin Memory Technologies =

Chinese semiconductor manufacturer

- Trade name: CXMT
- Native name: 长鑫存储技术有限公司
- Romanized name: Chángxīn Cúnchǔ Jìshù Yǒuxiàn Gōngsī
- Formerly: Innotron Memory; Hefei Chang Xin; Hefei Rui-li Integrated Circuit Manufacturing
- Type: Public; partially state-owned
- Traded as: SSE: 688825
- Industry: Semiconductors
- Founded: May 2016; 10 years ago
- Founder: Zhu Yiming
- Headquarters: Hefei, Anhui, China
- Key people: Zhu Yiming (Chairman)
- Products: DRAM
- Owner: Hefei government (36.8%)
- Number of employees: 19,298 (2025)
- Website: www.cxmt.com

ChangXin Memory Technologies
- Simplified Chinese: 长鑫存储
Transcriptions
Standard Mandarin
- Hanyu Pinyin: Chángxīn Cúnchǔ

ChangXin Memory Technologies (CXMT) (Note: Formerly known as Innotron Memory, Hefei Chang Xin, or Hefei Rui-li Integrated Circuit Manufacturing.) is a Chinese semiconductor integrated device manufacturer headquartered in Hefei, Anhui, specializing in the production of DRAM memory.

The company was producing 720,000 wafers per quarter by the end of 2025. As of 2026, the company is China's largest and the world's fourth-largest DRAM maker.

In 2025, it unveiled DDR5 DRAM and planned a Shanghai initial public offering to fund production upgrades and advanced DRAM research and development.

As of 2026, CXMT plans new fabs in Hefei and Shanghai with a capacity of 100K WPM each.

== History ==
Together with Fujian Jinhua Integrated Circuit (JHICC) and Xi'an UniIC Semiconductors, Innotron was one of a set of Chinese semiconductor plants established in 2016 to compete with global manufacturers of computer memory. In 2017, a $7.2 billion deal for a 125,000, 12" (300mm) wafer per month production fabrication plant was announced. Innotron's factory was completed by the middle of 2017, and production equipment was installed at the plant in late 2017. Trials and mass production were scheduled for late 2018 and early 2019. In 2018, CEO Zhu Yiming was reported to have visited ASML to discuss the purchase of extreme ultraviolet lithography machines.

Initially, Innotron was thought to have chosen 8GB LPDDR4 memory as its first product. At the time, analysts claimed that patent and other intellectual property issues would present a barrier to its competing with major manufacturers. In the middle of 2018, trial production of 19 nm 8GB LPDDR4 was reported to have begun. Innotron's initial capacity was ~20,000 wafers per month; a small output in terms of the industry as a whole.

In 2019, Innotron, which had changed its name to Changxin Memory Technologies, was reported to have made some design changes in an attempt to avoid possible technology-related sanctions deriving from the China–United States trade war. In December 2019, in an interview with EE Times, the company stated its first fab was in production and producing 20,000 wafers per month, making 8GB LPDDR4 and DDR4 DRAM at 19 nm.

As of 2020, ChangXin manufactured LPDDR4 and DDR4 memory on a 19 nm process, with a capacity of 40,000 wafers per month.

The company is reported to have increased production to 6% of the world DRAM output as of Q1 2025 with aim to increase to 10% by Q4 2025. It started selling DDR5 SDRAM around the start of 2025.

== Corporate structure and listing plans ==
The 2026 IPO prospectus identified the issuer as ChangXin Technology Group Co., Ltd., also named in English as CXMT Corporation. It stated that the company had no controlling shareholder and no actual controller. The prospectus identified five direct shareholders holding more than 5% of the company: Qinghui Jidian with 21.67%, ChangXin Integrated with 11.71%, China Integrated Circuit Industry Investment Fund Phase II with 8.73%, Hefei Jixin with 8.37%, and Anhui Investment with 7.91%. According to Reuters, investors linked to the Hefei government own 36.8% of the company.

Reuters reported in December 2025 that CXMT planned to raise 29.5 billion yuan through an initial public offering of 10.6 billion shares in Shanghai. The prospectus described the planned listing as an offering of renminbi ordinary shares on the Shanghai Stock Exchange STAR Market and said the public issue would account for at least 10% of post-issue share capital before any over-allotment option. In June 2026, the China Securities Regulatory Commission approved the registration of the IPO, with the approval valid for 12 months from the date of registration.

The prospectus said the planned net proceeds would be allocated to three projects: 7.5 billion yuan for memory-wafer production-line technology upgrades, 13 billion yuan for DRAM memory-technology upgrades, and 9 billion yuan for forward-looking DRAM research and development. Reuters reported in June 2026 that the planned Shanghai IPO would be the largest Chinese IPO of the year and part of a broader rebound in onshore technology listings.

CXMT shares soared almost 500% in their trading debut in Shanghai on 27 July 2026 as investors flocked to the Chinese chipmaker amid booming demand for AI memory chips. The stock opened at Rmb49.50 ($7.30) a share, compared with an IPO price of Rmb8.66.

=== U.S. federal ban ===
In 2022, the James M. Inhofe National Defense Authorization Act for Fiscal Year 2023 banned the U.S. federal government from buying or using chips from CXMT. In March 2024, Bloomberg News reported that the United States Department of Commerce's Bureau of Industry and Security was weighing sanctions on CXMT. In June 2026, the US Department of Defense added CXMT to a list of Chinese military-linked companies.

== Operations and products ==
As of 2026, the company is China's largest and the world's fourth-largest DRAM maker. Reuters reported in December 2025 that CXMT operated three 12-inch DRAM fabrication plants in Beijing and Hefei. Its prospectus, cited by Reuters, said the company had developed four generations of DRAM technology and held 4% of the global DRAM market in the second quarter of 2025. The same report said Samsung Electronics, SK Hynix and Micron Technology together held more than 90% of the market. By September 2026, CXMT's market share had risen to 10% of the global DRAM market.

CXMT's website lists DDR5 and DDR5 module products, LPDDR5 and LPDDR5X products, DDR4 and DDR4 module products, and LPDDR4X products. Reuters reported that the company unveiled its latest DDR5 DRAM chips in November 2025 and planned to use proceeds from a proposed Shanghai initial public offering to upgrade production lines, develop advanced DRAM and expand its product line.

The company has also invested in high-bandwidth memory (HBM), a specialised form of DRAM used with artificial-intelligence processors. Reuters reported that CXMT aimed to begin production by the end of 2026 at an HBM back-end packaging facility in Shanghai. By September 2026, the company had started low-rate risk production of HBM3E.

In May 2026, Reuters reported from a renewed prospectus that CXMT expected first-half revenue of 110 billion to 120 billion yuan. The report said first-quarter revenue had risen by more than 700% year on year to 50.8 billion yuan, with the company attributing the increase to higher DRAM prices, expanded output and an improved product mix.

== Trade theft allegations ==
CXMT has been implicated in a number of alleged intellectual property theft cases. In 2023, ten former Samsung employees were arrested for allegedly stealing trade secrets from Samsung. The stolen technology had cost Samsung more than US$1 billion to develop over a five-year period. At the time, Samsung's 10 nm process node was the only technology used for the mass production of 10 nm-class DRAM. CXMT allegedly recruited these former Samsung employees, and one of them has since become the company's head of development. The allegedly stolen trade secrets are said to have enabled CXMT to bypass much of the time-consuming and costly development process.

== See also ==
- XMC
- YMTC
- Semiconductor industry
- Semiconductor industry in China
- List of DRAM manufacturers
- List of semiconductor fabrication plants
