= Hu Haifeng =

Chinese politician and the son of Hu Jintao

- 胡海峰

Personal details
- Born: November 6, 1972 (age 53) Gansu, China
- Party: Chinese Communist Party
- Spouse: Frances Yung (div.)
- Education: Tsinghua University
- Occupation: Politician

Hu Haifeng (Chinese: 胡海峰; pinyin: Hú Hǎifēng; born November 6, 1972) is a Chinese politician and the son of Hu Jintao, former General Secretary of the Chinese Communist Party (CCP) and Paramount leader of China. He has served as CCP Committee Secretary of Lishui and the deputy CCP Committee Secretary and mayor of Jiaxing. Previously, he was CEO of Nuctech Company.

== Life and career ==
Hu attended Beijing 101 Middle School and earned an MBA from Tsinghua University.

He was the chairman of Nuctech, a Tsinghua University-owned company created in the late 1990s to make large scanners for shipping, trucking containers and railway cars, as well as luggage scanners and metal detectors for airports. After Hu became chairman of the company, it was granted a near-monopoly by the central authorities on the lucrative market for selling security equipment to airports in China. In 2006, the company had roughly 90% of the domestic market. In 2008, Hu Haifeng was promoted to Communist Party secretary of Tsinghua Holdings, which controls Nuctech and more than 20 other companies.

In July 2009, the Namibian government charged Nuctech with corruption. The company has been the focus for repeated allegations of unfair competition in the European Union, and also for corruption and abuse of office in the Philippines. In South Africa, investigations of corruption are underway regarding a contract obtained by the company for the sale of scanners amounting to 380 million Rand (US$54 million).

== Family ==
Hu was married to Frances Yung, the daughter of Larry Yung, from 2002 to 2013.
