= Zhitai =

Consumer storage brand of Yangtze Memory Technologies

ZHITAI
- Product type: Solid-state drives, portable SSDs and memory cards
- Current owner: Yangtze Memory Technologies
- Country: China
- Introduced: 2020
- Website: Official website

Zhitai (Chinese: 致态; pinyin: Zhìtài; stylized as ZHITAI) is a consumer storage brand of Yangtze Memory Technologies (YMTC), a Chinese manufacturer of NAND flash memory. Introduced in 2020, the brand is used for solid-state drives, portable SSDs and memory cards.

== History ==
YMTC introduced the ZHITAI product line in September 2020 with two consumer SSDs, the PCIe-based PC005 Active and the SATA-based SC001 Active. The original Chinese-language announcement referred to the product line as 致钛; subsequent YMTC product pages use 致态 as the brand's Chinese name.

By December 2022, YMTC had begun shipping the ZHITAI TiPlus7100, which used the company's 232-layer 3D NAND based on its Xtacking 3.0 architecture.

In 2023, ZHITAI released the 1 TB Ti600 SSD. An analysis by TechInsights identified a 232-layer quad-level cell NAND die in the drive, with a bit density of 19.8 Gb/mm². TechInsights described it as the highest bit density it had measured in a commercially available NAND product at the time.

In December 2024, Tom's Hardware reported on the ZHITAI TiPro9000, a PCI Express 5.0 SSD using YMTC's fifth-generation 3D TLC NAND with the Xtacking 4.0 architecture and a Silicon Motion SM2508 controller.

ZHITAI made its first appearance at Computex in 2025, where it exhibited internal SSDs, portable SSDs and memory cards. At Computex 2026, the company announced the TiPro9000, TiPlus9100 and TiPlus7100s as part of an expansion of the brand's activities in the Asia-Pacific consumer market.

== Awards and recognition ==
In 2025, the ZHITAI TiPro9000 received a Red Dot award in the Product Design category.

In 2026, the ZHITAI Spirit Neo portable SSD received a MUSE Design Award in a product-design category.
