= XMC (company) =

Chinese semiconductor company

Wuhan Xinxin Semiconductor Manufacturing Co., Ltd.
- Trade name: XMC
- Native name: 武汉新芯集成电路股份有限公司
- Romanized name: Wǔhàn Xīnxīn Jíchéng Diànlù Gǔfèn Yǒuxiàn Gōngsī
- Type: Subsidiary
- Industry: Semiconductors
- Founded: 21 April 2006; 20 years ago
- Headquarters: Wuhan, Hubei, China
- Key people: Sun Peng (CEO)
- Revenue: ▲CN¥3.82 billion (2023)
- Net income: ▼CN¥393.76 million (2023)
- Total assets: ▲CN¥15.03 billion (2023)
- Total equity: ▲CN¥7.19 billion (2023)
- Parent: Yangtze Memory Technologies
- Website: www.xmcwh.com

Wuhan Xinxin Semiconductor Manufacturing, Co., Ltd. (XMC; Chinese: 新芯股份; pinyin: Xīnxīn Gǔfèn) is a Chinese semiconductor integrated device manufacturer. It produces logic chips, contact image sensors and NOR flash memory.

It is a subsidiary of Yangtze Memory Technologies (YMTC) and plays an integral part in its 3D NAND memory production.

== Background ==
Wuhan Xinxin was originally founded by the Wuhan Government in 2006 as one of the first semiconductor foundries in Wuhan.

In October 2010, the Donghu New Technology Development Zone Administrative Committee and Semiconductor Manufacturing International Corporation (SMIC) jointly invested in Wuhan Xinxin. SMIC also struck a deal with the Wuhan Government to manage Wuhan Xinxin. Industry critics stated SMIC managed it "half-heartedly".

In March 2013, Wuhan Xinxin acquired SMIC's shares to become an independent company and rebranded itself as XMC shifting focus from foundry services for mainstream products to producing flash memory via an expanded partnership deal with Spansion.

In July 2016, Tsinghua Unigroup acquired a majority stake in XMC with the deal being brokered by the China Integrated Circuit Industry Investment Fund.Tsinghua Unigroup would merge XMC with its memory chip-making operations to form YMTC with XMC being a subsidiary under it.

On 3 December 2018, XMC announced the successful development of its three-dimensional wafer stacking technology based on its three-dimensional integration technology platform.

In March 2024, it was reported that XMC initiated a project focused on developing and manufacturing High Bandwidth Memory (HBM).

In July 2024, XMC partnered with Huawei to create high-bandwidth memory (HBM) chips.

In December 2024, XMC was targeted in a new round of US export controls and added to the United States Department of Commerce's Entity List.

== See also ==
- Yangtze Memory Technologies
- Semiconductor industry in China
