= GigaDevice =

Chinese semiconductor company

GigaDevice Semiconductor Inc.
- Type: Public
- Traded as: SSE: 603986 (A Shares); SEHK: 3986 (H Shares); CSI A100
- Industry: Semiconductors
- Founded: 2005
- Founder: Zhu Yiming
- Headquarters: Beijing, China
- Key people: Zhu Yiming (Chairman)
- Website: gigadevice.com

GigaDevice Semiconductor Inc. (Chinese: 兆易创新; pinyin: zhàoyì chuāngxīn) is a Chinese fabless semiconductor company that develops flash memory, microcontrollers (MCUs), sensor, analog products and solutions. Its flash memory portfolio includes SPI NOR Flash, SPI NAND Flash, and Parallel NAND Flash. Its microcontrollers are based on the ARM architecture (GD32 series), and RISC-V architecture (GD32V series).

== History ==
GigaDevice Semiconductor was founded in 2005 and is headquartered in Beijing, China. In 2008, it launched China's first Serial Peripheral Interface (SPI) NOR flash memory chip. And the expanding engineering team entered the Microcontroller Unit (MCU) market in 2013.

The company participated as part of the Chinese buyer consortium Uphill Investment Co. that acquired Integrated Silicon Solution Inc., a semiconductor company that is among the major producers of NOR flash, in 2015 for US$731 million. The buyer consortium beat out an offer by Cypress Semiconductor, a major competitor of GigaDevice in the NOR flash market.

The buyer consortium of Uphill Investment Co. comprises eTown MemTek Ltd, Summitview Capital, Beijing Integrated Circuit Design and Test Fund, and Huaqing Jiye Investment Management Co., Ltd. GigaDevice along with Beijing ETOWN, an investment firm and economic development agency of the Beijing Municipal Government, were the equity holders of eTown MemTek Ltd.

In August 2016, the company was listed on the Shanghai Stock Exchange.

In June 2023, GigaDevice signed the UN Global Compact.

In June 2025, GigaDevice established its global headquarters in Singapore.

On 13 January 2026, GigaDevice held its secondary listing on the Hong Kong Stock Exchange.

== Products ==
=== Microcontrollers ===
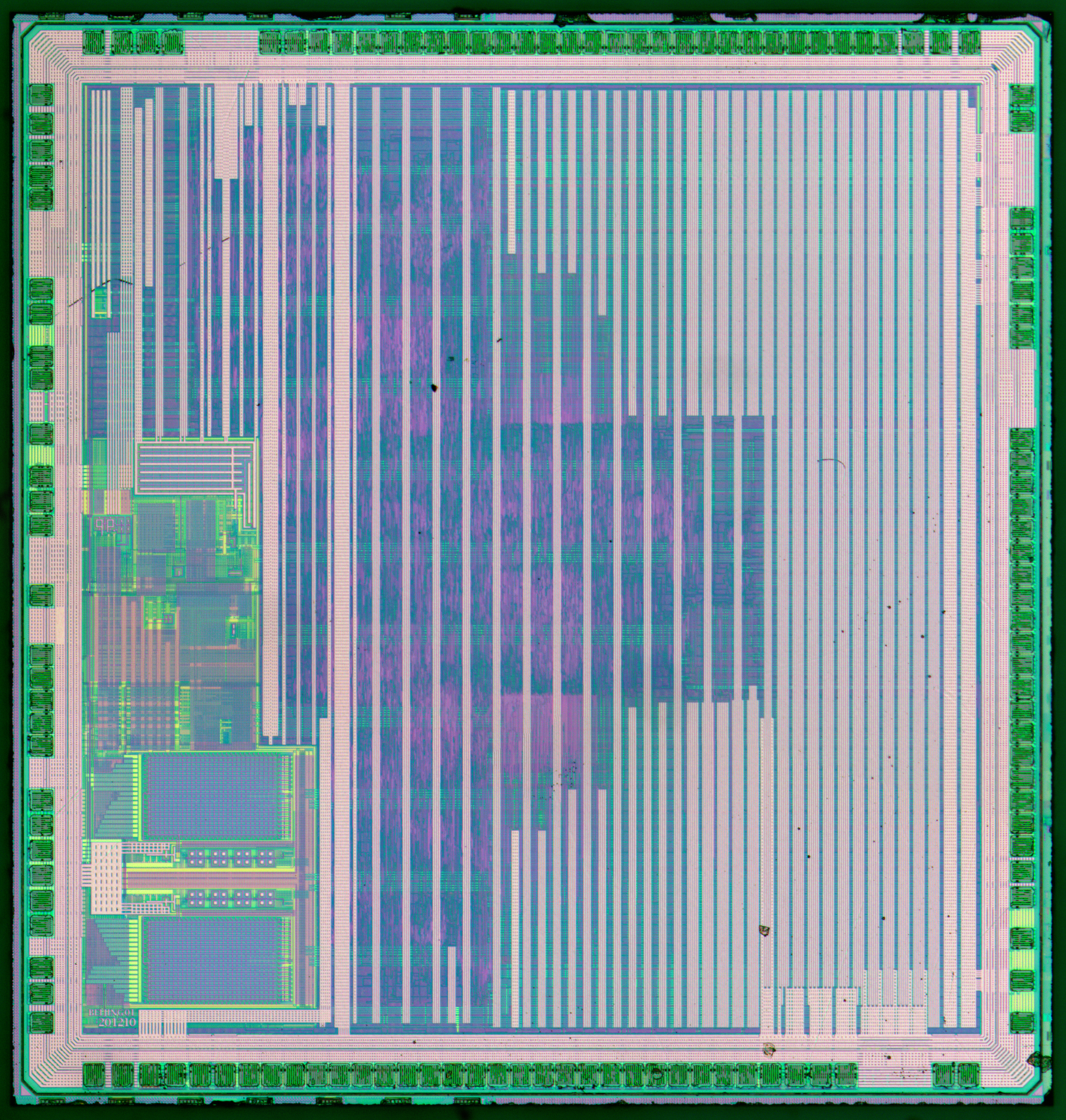
GigaDevice GD32F103CBT6 ARM Cortex-M3 based microcontroller die.

The GD32 series of microcontrollers are based on the ARM Cortex-M3 core. It was introduced in 2013 and has since expanded to include Cortex-M23, M4, M33, and M7 cores, with MCU frequencies ranging from 48 MHz up to 600 MHz. The series currently consists of several categories including High-Performance, Mainstream, Entry-Level, Low-Power, Wireless, Automotive, and Specific MCUs.

The GD32V series was introduced in 2019 and replaces ARM Cortex cores with custom implementation of RISC-V MCU core named "Bumblebee Core" (designed by Nuclei System Technology).
