= Zhu Yiming =

Chinese semiconductor entrepreneur

- 朱一明
- Born: 1972 (age 53–54); Yancheng, Jiangsu, China
- Education: Tsinghua University; Stony Brook University
- Occupation: Electronic engineer
- Known for: Founder and Chairman of ChangXin Memory Technologies and GigaDevice

Zhu Yiming (Chinese: 朱一明; pinyin: Zhū Yīmíng; born 1972) is a Chinese businessman who is Founder and Chairman of semiconductor companies, ChangXin Memory Technologies (CXMT) and GigaDevice.

== Early life and education ==
Zhu was born in 1972 in Yancheng, Jiangsu.

In 1989, Zhu enrolled in the physics department of Tsinghua University for his bachelor's degree. During his study at the university, Zhu worked part-time programming for companies in Beijing’s Zhongguancun technology hub. While working for the Chinese firms, Zhu realized that almost all integrated circuits used in China were designed and manufactured in the U.S. In 1994, Zhu obtained a master's degree in physics from Tsinghua.

After obtaining his master's degree, Zhu moved to the U.S with the intention of pursuing a PhD in physics at Stony Brook University. At the time, Physics Nobel laureate, Chen-Ning Yang was teaching at the university. However being focused on Silicon Valley, Zhu quit his PhD studies and instead graduated with a master's degree in electronic engineering.

== Career ==
After graduation, Zhu worked for cybersecurity company iPolicy Networks in the network processor and search engine chip unit. In 2001, he joined MoSys as a project lead for memory chip development.

In late 2003, Zhu began considering starting his own business after his idea of improving chip designs was undervalued by MoSys’ management.

In early April 2005, Zhu established GigaDevice in Silicon Valley with backing from Li Jun, a Tsinghua alumnus, who was impressed by Zhu's vision for static random-access memory (SRAM) based on the two-transistor-one-capacitor architecture. According to emails retained by Li, Zhu predicted that the center of the global memory industry would eventually shift towards mainland China. Li later connected Zhu with Silicon Valley Venture capitalist Hsun K Chou, who injected $100,000 into GigaDevice as an angel investor. Through Li's social network, Zhu made contact with Xue Jun, then deputy general manager of Tsinghua Science Park Venture Capital. Xue persuaded Zhu to relocate GigaDevice's business to China in late April 2005, arguing that the U.S. semiconductor market was highly saturated, leaving little room for startups.

Initially GigaDevice struggled to win over large electronics makers but eventually made a breakthrough landing a 100,000 yuan contract with Rockchip to put its memory technology into chips for MP3 players. GigaDevice eventually grew into one of China's leading chip design companies and listed on the Shanghai Stock Exchange in August 2016. In an interview published by Tsinghua's alumni magazine after GigaDevice's listing, Zhu attributed the company's success to choosing the right market and the hard work of his employees.

In the same year, Zhu partnered with the Hefei municipal government to lead the development of the "506" dynamic random-access memory (DRAM) manufacturing project which would eventually become CXMT. While GigaDevice could design chips and outsource their production, CXMT would have to build multibillion-dollar factories, master manufacturing processes and compete with companies that had decades of expertise such as Samsung Electronics, SK Hynix and Micron Technology.

In 2018, Zhu stepped down from his role as GigaDevice CEO to focus on CXMT where he pledged to have no salary as chairman and CEO. One of Zhu's important early moves was to secure licences to patents originally developed by Qimonda to give CXMT an intellectual-property base to reduce the risk of disputes with overseas rivals.

A breakthrough came in 2019, when CXMT signed an agreement giving it access to numerous DRAM-related patents held by a subsidiary of WiLAN.

In July 2026, CXMT was set to be listed on the Shanghai Stock Exchange STAR Market. Zhu has reportedly pledged to distribute half of his post-listing stake in CXMT worth an estimated 20 billion yuan to company employees, saying he wants the team to share in the company's success.
