= PC Power and Cooling =

American power supply manufacturer

- Formerly: PC Power & Cooling, Inc. (1985–2007)
- Industry: Electronics
- Founded: April 1985; 40 years ago
- Founder: Doug Dodson
- Products: Computer power supplies
- Parent: OCZ Technology (2007–2014); FirePower Technology (2014–present)

PC Power and Cooling (stylized as PC Power & Cooling), a subsidiary of FirePower Technology, is an American manufacturer of computer power supplies based in Carlsbad, California. The company was established by Doug Dodson in 1985. In 2007, the company was acquired by OCZ Technology. In 2014, FirePower Technology acquired OCZ Technology Group's power supply division, which included PC Power and Cooling.

The company was involved in many technologies related to computer temperature management. It sells products to both consumer and enterprise channels. The company can customize power supplies for American OEM customers in their Carlsbad facility.

== History ==
PC Power and Cooling, Inc., was founded by Doug Dodson in April 1985. An electronic hobbyist since childhood, Dodson worked in the financial sector as an adult in the late 1970s and early 1980s. In 1983, his workplace issued him a IBM PC XT—the power supply of which he deemed intolerably noisy due to its small cooling fan. He outfitted the power supply with a special large-diameter fan to quell the noise. This attracted the attention of his coworkers, who asked him to perform the same modification to their PCs. In 1985, Dodson set up shop in his garage to perform the modification to interested customers as a side business. Shortly into this venture, Dodson saw the need to reinvent the PC's power supply from scratch, as he deemed it "poorly designed by IBM in the early days. The fan would cavitate. There was no real airflow coming out, so you had a ton of noise and no cooling." Dodson then incorporated PC Power and Cooling in Bonsall, California, within San Diego County, where he hired a team of engineers to develop supplies running at a lower temperature than IBM's stock supply for the XT while generating less noise.

In 1986, the company launched their Silencer line of power supplies, featuring a 120-mm-diameter fan. Shortly after, they developed the Turbo-Cool line of supplies, the first XT-compatible power supply with multiple fans. Between 1986 and 1987, the company sold 1,000 Silencers and 5,000 Turbo-Cools. The lowest-end entries in the line then were rated for between 150 and 200 watts. In September 2005, the company introduced the first PC power supply rated for 1000 watts.

In around 1992, PC Power and Cooling relocated to Carlsbad, California, occupying a 13,000-square-foot facility. By 2005, they employed 40 workers. In May 2007, OCZ Technology of San Jose, California, announced their pending acquisition of PC Power and Cooling. The acquisition was completed by September 2007, with OCZ paying PC Power and Cooling an estimated $13 million for the deal. During their tenure under OCZ, PC Power and Cooling's branded products shifted more towards the enthusiast and businesses, while OCZ Technology branded power supplies cater more towards the gaming and entry level enthusiast segments. The company as a subsidiary of OCZ had a mutual relationship with OCZ's power supply group, with the latter developing PC Power's products in tandem with their own, while PC Power's engineers (including Dodson) worked as consultants and testers of OCZ's branded power supplies. In February 2014, FirePower Technology announced the acquisition of OCZ Technology Group's power supply division, which by then included PC Power and Cooling.

== Models ==
The Silencer brand of power supply units is available in 1050-watt and 1200-watt varieties as of October 2022. Variants in Dell's proprietary form factor of power supply units have also been offered. PC Power and Cooling also offers a maximum performance line of power supplies, the Turbo-Cool units, which as of October 2022 is available in one version of 860 watts.

PC Power and Cooling has several power supplies that are 80 Plus certified; the Silencer 910W achieved the Silver Certification at over 88 percent efficiency.
