= Indilinx =

Indilinx, Inc.
- Indilinx logo
- Type: Subsidiary
- Industry: Solid-state storage
- Founded: 2006
- Defunct: August 18, 2014
- Fate: Bankruptcy
- Successor: OCZ Storage Solutions
- Headquarters: Milpitas, California
- Key people: Bumsoo Kim, Guiyoung Lee, Hyunmo Chung
- Products: Flash controller
- Parent: ZCO Liquidating Corporation

Indilinx, Inc. was a formerly South Korean-based solid-state drive (SSD) controller manufacturer with business headquarters in San Jose, California. It was a wholly owned subsidiary of the OCZ Technology Group until the latter sold the former's assets to Toshiba in OCZ's bankruptcy sale, and those assets were fully integrated into the newly founded OCZ Storage Solutions division of Toshiba.

Indilinx's main product was its Barefoot series of flash controllers and their associated firmware for solid state drives.

== History ==
Indilinx was established on October 19, 2006 by Bumsoo Kim, Guiyoung Lee, and Hyunmo Chung. Their first office was in Bundang, South Korea. In December 2006 Indilinx was certified as a venture company by the KIBO Technology Fund. In February 2007 they moved to their advanced technology research center in Seongnam, South Korea.

The Indilinx Barefoot is an ARM-based SATA controller used in high performance SSDs. Drives based on this controller were approximately competitive with the Intel X25-M, while boasting generally lower prices and greater retail availability. TRIM support is available for almost all drives, with appropriate firmware released by respective drive manufacturers. Performance, cost, and features were broadly similar across all product lines that were tested in 2009 by Anandtech, with most differences coming down to the speed of the flash memory devices instead of the controllers.

A rate of 230 MB/s was announced in August 2008, with availability in the fourth quarter of 2008.

In March 2011, OCZ acquired Indilinx Co., Ltd. OCZ intellectual property including approximately 20 patents and patent applications, for approximately $32 million of OCZ common stock. Indilinx continued to produce and supply its line of controller products. The Indilinx controller business, and its 45 employees, remained under Bumsoo Kim, the founder and president of Indilinx, and Hyunmo Chung, Indilinx's chief technology officer. With the SATA 2.0 data transfer protocol increasingly proving to be the bottleneck for SSD performance, Indilinx released the Everest series controller supporting the SATA revision 3.0 protocol in July 2011.

Indilinx filed for Chapter 11 bankruptcy on December 2, 2013 alongside its parent company, then known as OCZ Technology Group. Both companies' assets were sold to Toshiba. OCZ Technology Group then changed its name to ZCO Liquidating Corporation. On August 18, 2014, ZCO Liquidating Corporation and its subsidiaries including Inidilinx were liquidated.
