= Etron Technology =

Taiwanese electronics company

Etron Technology, Inc.
- Native name: 鈺創科技
- Type: Public
- Traded as: TPEx: 5351
- ISIN: TW0005351001
- Industry: Semiconductors, Consumer Electronics
- Founded: February 1991; 35 years ago
- Headquarters: Hsinchu, Taiwan
- Number of employees: 450
- Website: Official website

Etron Technology, Inc. (Traditional: 鈺創科技; Simplified: 钰创科技; Pinyin: Yu-Chuang Ke Ji) is a Taiwanese electronics company that produces dynamic RAM and systems-on-a-chip.

Founded in 1991 by Nicky Lu, the company did an initial public offering in 1998. In 2016, Etron did spinoffs of two subsidiaries: eEver Technology and eYs3D Microelectronics.
