= Yangtze Memory Technologies =

Chinese semiconductor company

Yangtze Memory Technologies Corp.
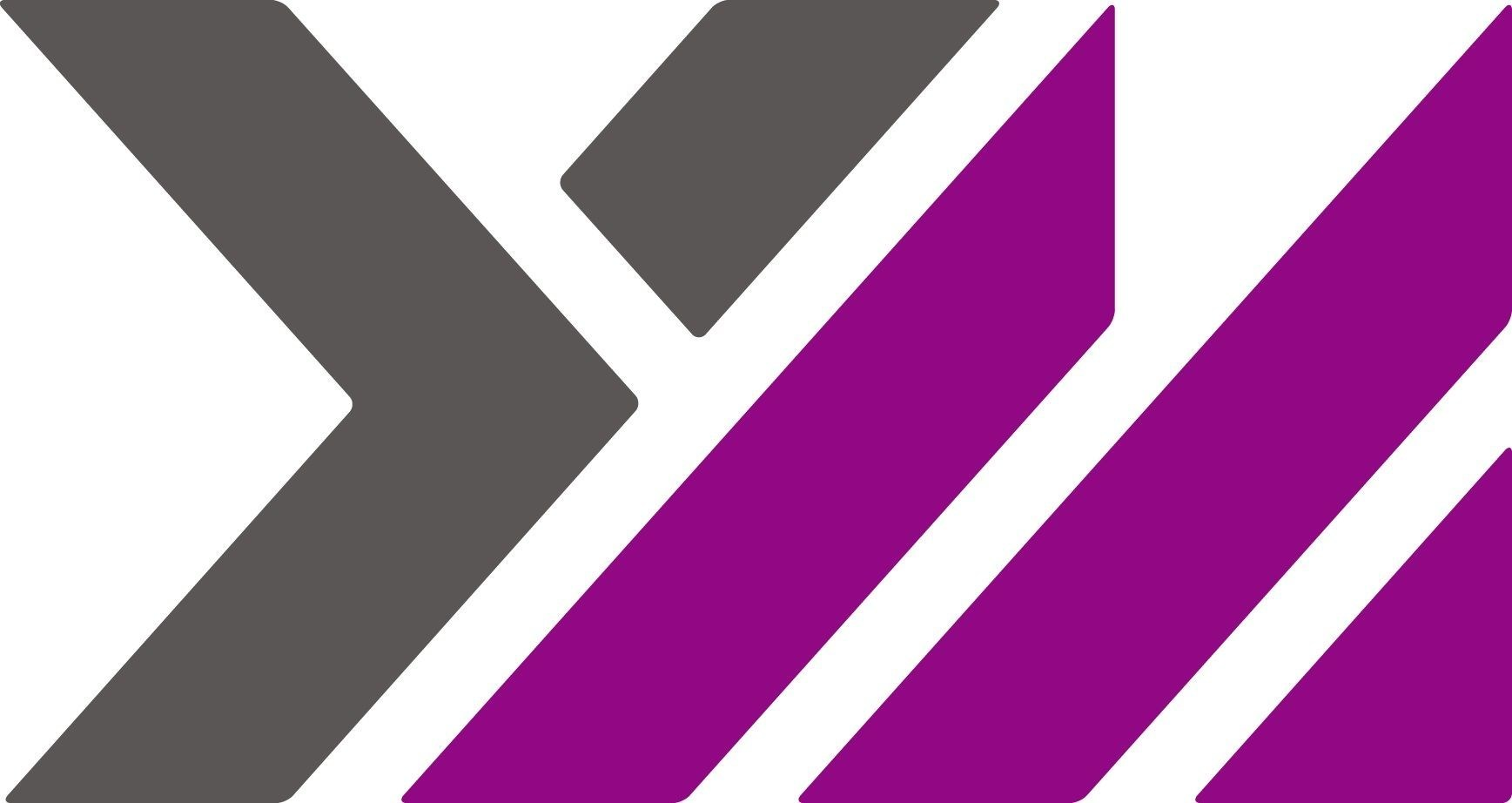
- Native name: 长江存储科技有限责任公司
- Type: Partially state-owned enterprise
- Industry: Semiconductors
- Founded: July 26, 2016; 10 years ago
- Headquarters: Wuhan, Hubei, China
- Area served: Worldwide
- Key people: Chen Nanxiang (Chairman and CEO)
- Products: 3D NAND flash-memory wafers and packaged chips; Embedded memory solutions (eMMC and UFS); Consumer and enterprise solid-state drives
- Brands: Xtacking; Zhitai
- Number of employees: ~8,000 (2023)
- Parent: CCSH Corporation (长江存储控股股份有限公司; 100%)
- Subsidiaries: XMC
- Website: www.ymtc.com

Yangtze Memory Technologies Corp.
- Simplified Chinese: 长江存储科技有限责任公司
- Traditional Chinese: 長江存儲科技有限責任公司
Transcriptions
Standard Mandarin
- Hanyu Pinyin: Chángjiāng Cúnchǔ Kējì Yǒuxiànzérèn Gōngsī

YMTC
- Chinese: 长江存储
Transcriptions
Standard Mandarin
- Hanyu Pinyin: Chángjiāng Cúnchǔ

Yangtze Memory Technologies Corp. (YMTC) is a Chinese semiconductor integrated device manufacturer specializing in flash memory (NAND) chips. Founded in Wuhan, China, in 2016, with government investment and a goal of reducing the country's dependence on foreign chip manufacturers, the company was formerly a subsidiary of partially state-owned enterprise Tsinghua Unigroup.

YMTC produces enterprise solid state drives under its own brand and for resellers like Lexar, HP, Acer, Kingston, Teamgroup. Its consumer products are marketed under the brand ZhiTai (Chinese: 致态).

== History ==
Tsinghua Unigroup founded YMTC in July 2016, with a total investment of US$24 billion, including investments from the Hubei Provincial People's Government and the state-owned China Integrated Circuit Industry Investment Fund.

In 2018, YMTC released its Xtacking architecture designed for Vertical NAND chips at the Flash Memory Summit, receiving the "Best of Show" award for "Most Innovative Flash Memory Start-up Company". YMTC's 3D NAND flash memory chips were the first to be domestically mass-produced in China. Later in 2018, YMTC announced mass production of its 32-layer 3D NAND flash memory chip, and in September 2019, YMTC reported that it had started mass-producing its 64-layer TLC 3D NAND flash memory chip, with both chips using its Xtacking architecture.

In April 2020, YMTC announced that it had developed a 128-layer 1.33 Tb flash memory chip. From 2020 to 2021 YMTC suffered from unsatisfactory yield from its initial risk production of the 128-layer memory chip, averaging around 30 to 40 percent. In September 2020, YMTC unveiled its first line of consumer products under the brand name Zhitai.

As of 2021, YMTC was planning its second fab with a capacity of 100,000 wafers per month which will double its total output to 200,000 wpm. In September 2021, the company's chief operating officer announced that the company had shipped more than 300 million 64-layer memory chips, and the company's 128-layer QLC memory chip was ready for volume production.

News agencies reported in January 2022 that YMTC had scrapped its intention to build a second 3D NAND fab announced in 2017, citing serious financial issues at Tsinghua Unigroup, its parent firm. Bloomberg News reported in March 2022 that Apple was exploring purchasing NAND chips from YMTC to diversify its NAND chip vendors.

In May 2022, PCI-SIG listed two NVMe enterprise SSDs from YMTC as PCIe 4.0 verified. In July 2022, the company's CEO Simon Yang resigned citing personal reasons. Yang remains with the company as deputy chairman.

In August 2022, YMTC unveiled the X3-9070, its first 232-layer 3D NAND chip. In October 2022, Apple announced that it would drop a plan to use YMTC memory chips in its phones amid political pressure. In November 2022 a TechInsights report stated that YMTC had delivered 232-layer 3D NAND Flash to the market.

In December 2022, YMTC was added to the U.S. Entity List. In February 2023 the company reportedly laid off 10 percent of its workforce, cancelled equipment orders, and delayed plant expansion plans in response to US sanctions and challenging market conditions caused by low demand. In March, China Integrated Circuit Industry Investment Fund announced its intention to invest an additional $1.9 billion into YMTC, indicating a potential revival of government funding. In September 2023 the South China Morning Post reported that YMTC intensified its efforts to substitute US-sourced equipment with domestic alternatives, following a $7 billion capital infusion from state-supported investors. TechInsights reported in October 2023 that YMTC shipped its first 232-layer 3D QLC NAND, setting an industry record of 19.8 Gbit/mm2. In October 2023, YMTC again raised billions of dollars in a major fundraising round, necessitated by the high costs of adapting to stringent U.S. restrictions, including replacing U.S. equipment and developing new components, which had already depleted the $7 billion funding received prior.

On November 9, 2023, YMTC sued rival memory maker Micron in the United States District Court for the Northern District of California, alleging infringement on eight of its patents.

In February 2024, the U.S. Department of Defense designated YMTC as a "military company" that poses national security risks to the United States, barring it from using U.S.-designed chipmaking equipment and supplying products to the U.S. military. Following its designation as a "military company" by the U.S. Department of Defense, YMTC released a statement refuting the allegation, asserting that it has not supplied its technology for military use and is not owned or controlled by the Chinese military.

In March 2024, YMTC announced a breakthrough with its X3-6070 3D QLC NAND chips, achieving the endurance of 3D TLC NAND with 4,000 program/erase cycles. Due to U.S. trade sanctions, as of September 2024, the company started working with Chinese semiconductor equipment manufacturers such as Advanced Micro-Fabrication Equipment, Naura Technology Group and Piotech. Despite these, the company still relies on Western manufacturers like ASML Holding and U.S.-based company Lam Research.

In February 2025, there are multiple reporting that Samsung is set to use hybrid bonding patent from YMTC for the production of 400-layer NAND flash memory.

In March 2025, YMTC was reported to be planning price increases alongside Micron and Sandisk amid reduced production and strong AI-driven demand for memory chips. In June 2025, YMTC sued Micron Technology and public-affairs firm DCI Group in the United States District Court for the District of Columbia, alleging false advertising and unfair competition. YMTC accused Micron of funding a campaign through the DCI-operated "China Tech Threat" website that falsely claimed its chips contained spyware and posed national-security risks.

In September 2025, Reuters reported that YMTC planned to expand into dynamic random-access memory (DRAM), including technologies used to produce high-bandwidth memory for artificial-intelligence systems. The company was developing through-silicon via packaging for stacking DRAM dies and was considering allocating part of a new Wuhan fabrication plant to DRAM production.

In April 2026, Reuters reported that YMTC planned to build two additional fabrication plants beyond a third Wuhan plant that was nearing completion. The three new plants were expected to more than double the company's production capacity when fully operational. The third plant was expected to begin operations in late 2026 and reach a capacity of 50,000 wafers per month in 2027, with more than half of its equipment sourced from Chinese suppliers. In May, YMTC hired CITIC Securities and entered China's formal pre-IPO tutoring process.

In June 2026, YMTC entered the South Korean consumer-storage market. Reuters reported the following month that, since its addition to the U.S. Entity List in 2022, the company had replaced around half of its equipment with Chinese-made machinery and developed techniques for stacking memory layers using less-advanced tools.

In August 2026, Counterpoint Research estimated that YMTC accounted for 14% of global NAND bit shipments during the second quarter, placing it third behind Samsung Electronics and SK Hynix and ahead of Kioxia. Counterpoint ranked YMTC fifth by NAND revenue, attributing the difference to its consumer-focused product mix and its smaller presence in higher-priced enterprise solid-state drives.

On 13 August 2026, U.S. District Judge Carl J. Nichols dismissed YMTC's 2025 action against Micron and DCI Group. Nichols ruled that the statements challenged by YMTC were political rather than commercial speech and therefore could not support the company's false-advertising claim under the Lanham Act. Micron and DCI denied wrongdoing.

On 21 August 2026, the Shanghai Stock Exchange accepted for review the STAR Market IPO application of CCSH Corporation (Chinese: 长江存储控股股份有限公司), YMTC's parent company and proposed listing vehicle. CCSH sought to raise 33 billion yuan (US$4.9 billion), including 20.8 billion yuan for production-line upgrades and 12.2 billion yuan for research and development. The filing identified the wholly owned YMTC subsidiary as the group's principal operating business, accounting for more than 90% of its revenue.

== Technology ==
YMTC's 3D NAND is based on its Xtacking architecture, introduced in 2018, in which the memory cell array and the peripheral CMOS logic circuits are fabricated on separate wafers and joined face-to-face by wafer bonding, using plasma activation and thermal annealing. Because the logic wafer is processed separately, it can use a faster logic process, which the company says increases input/output speeds and shortens development cycles. Later generations of the architecture use hybrid bonding, in which copper interconnects are bonded directly between the two wafers: Xtacking 2.0 was used for the 128-layer third-generation flash, Xtacking 3.0 for the 232-layer fourth generation, and Xtacking 4.0 for the fifth.

In early 2025, YMTC began shipping fifth-generation 3D TLC NAND with 294 layers (232 of them active) and a bit density above 20 Gbit/mm^{2}, comparable to SK Hynix's ninth-generation NAND, without a formal product announcement. By September 2025, a 267-layer TLC variant was in mass production, with NAND exceeding 300 layers in development. The company has also focused on QLC NAND, where its 232-layer chips set an industry density record in 2023 and its X3-6070 QLC chip reached endurance ratings comparable to TLC NAND in 2024.

== International reception ==
=== United States ===
In July 2021 U.S. Representatives Michael McCaul and Bill Hagerty wrote a letter to the United States Secretary of Commerce arguing that YMTC should be placed on the department's Entity List. The letter stated that YMTC will assist the Chinese government in using unfair trade tactics to force American competitors out of the memory-chip sector, thereby putting US national security in jeopardy. It also highlighted YMTC's alleged close ties with the Chinese Communist Party and People's Liberation Army. Additionally, some YMTC executives previously worked for Semiconductor Manufacturing International Corporation, which was added to the Entity List in December 2020.

In April 2022 U.S. Senator Marco Rubio voiced his displeasure with reports that Apple was considering procuring NAND chips from YMTC. YMTC, according to Rubio, has ties to the Chinese Communist Party and the People's Liberation Army. In September 2022, additional legislators urged the White House to put YMTC on the entity list after a report was released about YMTC's supply of chips to Huawei. In October 2022, the Biden administration announced 31 Chinese companies, including YMTC, were being added to the Unverified List. On December 15, the Biden administration added YMTC to the Entity List. The James M. Inhofe National Defense Authorization Act for Fiscal Year 2023 also banned the U.S. federal government from buying or using chips from YMTC. In January 2024, the United States Department of Defense named YMTC on its list of "Chinese Military Companies Operating in the United States." On March 3, 2024, The Wall Street Journal reported that in 2022, Micron lobbied the U.S. government to block exports to YMTC and spent more on lobbying in the past two years than any prior period.

In February 2026, YMTC was removed from the Pentagon's list in an updated version. In April 2026, a U.S. House panel advanced the MATCH Act, a bill that would tighten export restrictions on chipmaking equipment destined for YMTC and other Chinese chipmakers, an effort Reuters reported was driven in part by lobbying from Micron. On June 8, 2026, the Department of Defense added the company back to the list.

In July 2026, The Wall Street Journal reported that Apple CEO Tim Cook and other executives had lobbied President Donald Trump and administration officials to allow the use of memory chips from YMTC in Apple products sold outside the US, a move opposed by Micron. Later that month, a bipartisan group of senators led by Jim Banks and Chuck Schumer sent a letter to Cook urging Apple to commit to not using memory chips from YMTC and CXMT in any of its products worldwide, citing their designation by the Pentagon as Chinese military companies, and requested a response by August 21, 2026.

== See also ==
- XMC
- CXMT
- Semiconductor industry in China
- List of semiconductor fabrication plants
