= Tsinghua Holdings =

Chinese state-owned company

Tsinghua Holdings Corp., Ltd.
- Native name: 清华控股有限公司
- Company type: State-owned enterprise
- Founded: 2001; 25 years ago
- Headquarters: Beijing, China
- Area served: mainland China
Key people
Xu Jinghong	(Chairman)
Long Dawei	(Vice-Chairman & Party Committee Secretary)
Zhou Liye	(President)
- Revenue: ▲CN¥70.539 billion (2015)
- Operating income: ▲CN¥4.594 billion (2015)
- Net income: ▲CN¥1.514 billion (2015)
- Total assets: ▲CN¥207.227 billion (2015)
- Total equity: ▲CN¥17.729 billion (2015)
- Owner: Tsinghua University (100%)
Parent
Tsinghua University	(direct)
the Ministry of Education	(intermediate)
the State Council of China	(ultimate)
- Subsidiaries: Tsinghua Unigroup

Chinese name
- Simplified Chinese: 清华控股有限公司
- Traditional Chinese: 清華控股有限公司
Transcriptions
Standard Mandarin
- Hanyu Pinyin: Qīnghuá Kònggǔ Yǒuxiàn Gōngsī
- Website: www.thholding.com.cn
- Footnotes / references in a consolidated basis, excluding minority interest

Tsinghua Holdings Corp., Ltd. is a wholly owned subsidiary of Tsinghua University. The company was established as an in-house asset management company for Tsinghua's subsidiaries that were established in the 1990s by the technology transfer of research to business.

== History ==
Tsinghua Holdings was formally formed in 2003 (though preliminarily tested in 2001) in response to the 2001 policy of separating universities and university-owned enterprises; all the shares of subsidiaries of Tsinghua University were transferred to Tsinghua Holdings. Announced by State Council of China in 2001, the plan aimed to separate ownership and management of holdings, bring on professional business managers, and separate assets of operating business and non-operating business. The university itself did not invest in other companies directly thereafter, but through the holding companies. The role of the university is to supervisor holding companies via nominating the board of directors with oversight for business plans, major investments, salary structure and other roles.

The predecessor of Tsinghua Holdings, Beijing Tsinghua University Enterprise Group (Chinese: 北京清华大学企业集团; pinyin: Běijng Qīnghuá Dàxué Qǐyè Jítuán), was incorporated on 26 August 1992. The university used an established company to become a new holding company in 2001 for its subsidiaries. According to 2010 Annual Report of Tsinghua Holdings, some assets unrelated to its business scope were transferred back to the university.

== Company officials ==
Hu Haifeng, the son of then General Secretary of the Chinese Communist Party Hu Jintao, was appointed in 2009 as the Party Committee Secretary of Tsinghua Holdings.

As of 2017, the Party Committee Secretary of Tsinghua Holdings was Long Dawei (Chinese: 龙大伟), who also served as the vice-chairman. The current chairman was Xu Jinghong (Chinese: 徐井宏).

Rong Yonglin (Chinese: 荣泳霖) was the former chairman of the holding.

== Subsidiaries ==
=== Chengzhi Shareholding ===
Chengzhi Co., Ltd was set up in Jiangxi province; its controlling shareholder is Tsinghua Holdings, and it was part of the corporate structure used in the acquisition of Shijiashuang Yongsheng Huatsing Liquid Crystal Co.

=== Tsing Capital ===
Tsing Capital describes itself as a clean tech venture capital arm of Tsinghua Holdings.

=== Tsinghua Unigroup ===
Tsinghua Unigroup is a fabless semiconductor company that is 51 percent owned by Tsinghua Holdings and 49 percent owned by Beijing Jiankun Investment Group; the latter is led by Tsinghua Unigroup chairman and CEO Zhao Weiguo. In December 2013, it acquired Spreadtrum, now Unisoc, then acquired RDA Microelectronics in 2014. In 2016, Tsinghua Unigroup, Hubei Province and the China Integrated Circuit Industry Investment Fund invested in Yangtze Memory Technologies. The $24 billion project employs about 6,000 people, with offices in Shanghai, Beijing and Silicon Valley. In 2017, Tsinghua Unigroup formed Shanghai JV, a joint-venture with ChipMOS of Taiwan. In 2019, it formed a subsidiary to produce DRAM memory chips.

== Companies incubated under Tsinghua Holdings ==
- Hwatsing Technology
- Tsinghua Tongfang
