= Kioxia =

Japanese flash-memory and data-storage group

Kioxia Holdings Corporation

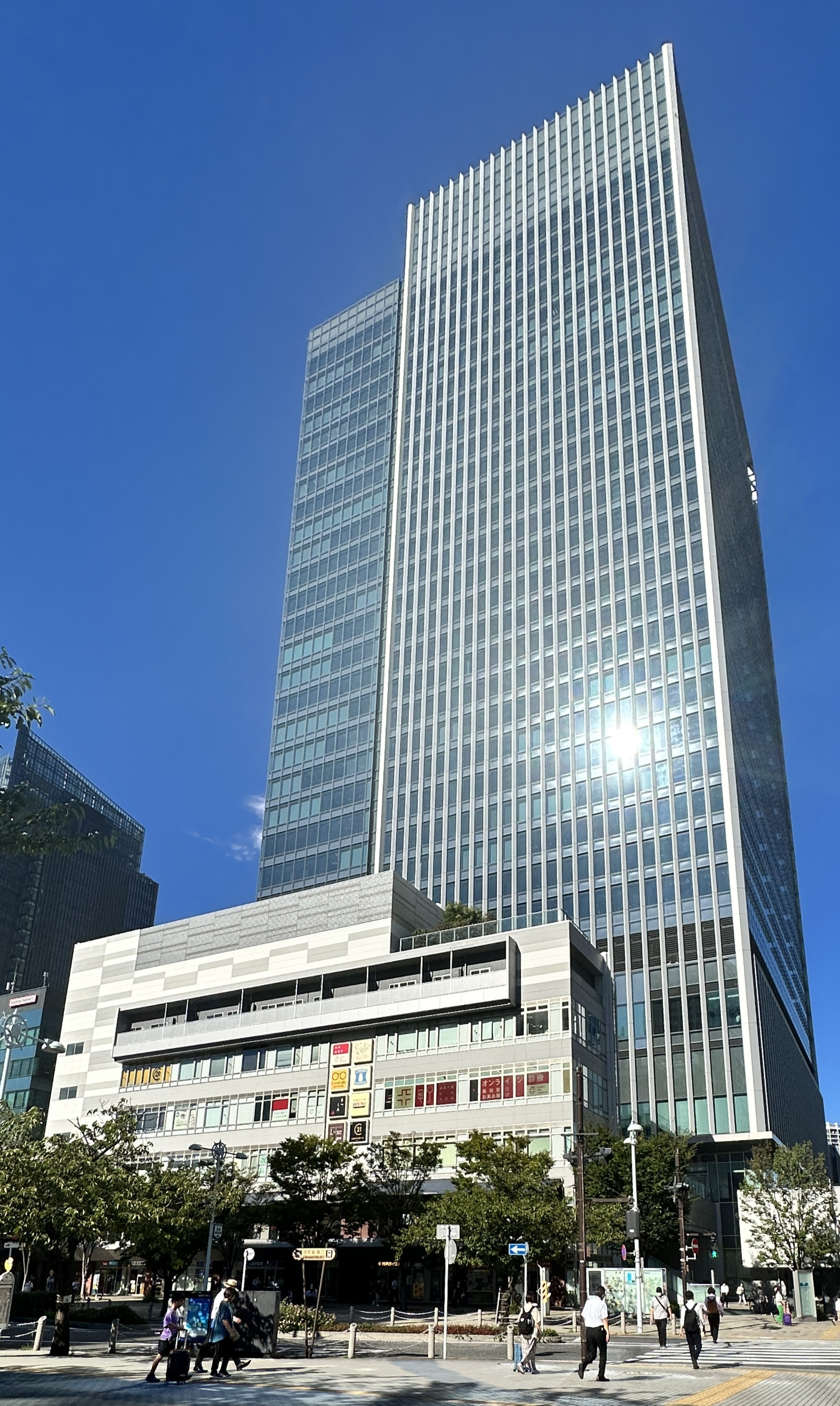
- Kioxia's headquarters at msb Tamachi Station Tower S in Shibaura, Tokyo
- Native name: キオクシアホールディングス株式会社
- Formerly: Toshiba Memory Holdings Corporation (March–October 2019)
- Type: Public
- Traded as: TYO: 285A
- Industry: Semiconductor industry
- Founded: March 1, 2019; 7 years ago
- Headquarters: Shibaura, Minato, Tokyo, Japan
- Area served: Worldwide
- Key people: Hiroo Ota (President and CEO)
- Products: Flash memory; Solid-state drives
- Revenue: ▲¥2.34 trillion (US$14.77 billion) (FY2026)
- Operating income: ▲¥876.2 billion (US$5.53 billion) (FY2026)
- Net income: ▲¥559.6 billion (US$3.53 billion) (FY2026)
- Total assets: ▲¥3.13 trillion (US$19.74 billion) (FY2026)
- Total equity: ▲¥1.25 trillion (US$7.88 billion) (FY2026)
- Number of employees: 15,400 (2026)
- Subsidiaries: Kioxia Corporation (100%)
- Website: kioxia-holdings.com; kioxia.com

Kioxia (/kiˈoʊksiə/) is a Japanese semiconductor memory and data-storage group headquartered in Tokyo. It is headed by the publicly traded holding company Kioxia Holdings Corporation. Its wholly owned principal operating subsidiary, Kioxia Corporation, develops, manufactures and sells NAND flash memory, solid-state drives (SSDs), and related storage products.

Kioxia Corporation began operations as Toshiba Memory Corporation on April 1, 2017, after Toshiba separated its memory business into a new company. A consortium led by Bain Capital acquired the business from Toshiba in June 2018. Toshiba Memory Holdings Corporation was established as its holding company on March 1, 2019, and both companies adopted the Kioxia name in October 2019. Kioxia Holdings was listed on the Tokyo Stock Exchange Prime Market on December 18, 2024.

Kioxia traces its flash-memory technology to Toshiba, where engineers led by Fujio Masuoka developed flash memory in the 1980s and invented NAND flash memory in 1987. According to TrendForce, Kioxia ranked third among NAND flash suppliers by revenue in the first quarter of 2026, with a 13.9% market share.

== Name ==
The name Kioxia is a combination of the Japanese word 記憶 kioku, meaning "memory", and the Greek word αξία axia, meaning "value".

== History ==
=== Origins at Toshiba ===
In 1984, Fujio Masuoka and his colleagues at Toshiba presented a flash EEPROM memory cell at the International Electron Devices Meeting. Toshiba engineers subsequently invented NAND flash memory in 1987 and commercialized a 4-Mbit NAND device in 1991.

In January 2014, Toshiba completed its acquisition of the assets of OCZ Technology Group and launched OCZ Storage Solutions as a subsidiary, adding OCZ's SSD business to Toshiba's storage operations.

=== Spin-off and sale by Toshiba ===
In December 2016, Toshiba disclosed the possibility of major goodwill and losses related to Westinghouse Electric Company's acquisition of the nuclear construction and services business CB&I Stone & Webster. In January 2017, Toshiba said the potential losses could amount to several billion US dollars and that it needed to strengthen its financial structure.

Toshiba decided to separate its memory business into a single business entity and consider an injection of third-party capital as a financial measure. Toshiba Memory Corporation commenced operations on April 1, 2017, as a wholly owned Toshiba subsidiary responsible for the memory and related-products business.

Toshiba subsequently agreed to sell Toshiba Memory to K.K. Pangea, a special-purpose acquisition company formed by a consortium led by Bain Capital. The ¥2 trillion sale was completed on June 1, 2018. Toshiba reinvested in the business, and after the acquisition Pangea's voting rights were held 49.9% by BCPE Pangea Cayman, L.P., 40.2% by Toshiba and 9.9% by Hoya Corporation. On August 1, Pangea merged with Toshiba Memory Corporation, with the combined company retaining the Toshiba Memory Corporation name.

=== Establishment of Kioxia and acquisitions ===
Toshiba Memory Holdings Corporation was incorporated on March 1, 2019, through a sole-share transfer from Toshiba Memory Corporation. The operating company became its wholly owned subsidiary and continued to conduct research and development, manufacturing, marketing and sales, while the holding company assumed group strategy and management oversight.

A power outage in Yokkaichi in June 2019 disrupted production at the Toshiba Memory and Western Digital flash manufacturing operations. Western Digital estimated that the incident reduced its flash wafer availability by about 6 exabytes.

In August 2019, Toshiba Memory announced an agreement to acquire the SSD business of Taiwanese electronics manufacturer Lite-On for US$165 million. The acquisition was completed on July 1, 2020.

On October 1, 2019, Toshiba Memory Holdings Corporation was renamed Kioxia Holdings Corporation and Toshiba Memory Corporation was renamed Kioxia Corporation.

=== IPO attempts and public listing ===
Kioxia planned an initial public offering in 2020, but on September 28 the company postponed the offering, citing continued market volatility and concerns about a second wave of the COVID-19 pandemic.

In February 2022, contamination of a material used in 3D NAND production disrupted operations at the Yokkaichi and Kitakami plants. Western Digital estimated that at least 6.5 exabytes of its flash availability were affected.

In 2023, Kioxia held merger talks with its manufacturing partner Western Digital. The negotiations stalled after SK Hynix, an indirect investor in Kioxia, opposed the proposed combination.

Kioxia revived its listing plans in 2024 as NAND prices and demand recovered. Reuters reported that investment in AI servers and inventory replenishment by smartphone and PC customers contributed to improved market conditions. Kioxia Holdings completed its initial public offering and began trading on the Tokyo Stock Exchange Prime Market on December 18, 2024. The IPO raised ¥120 billion, including the overallotment.

== Products and technology ==
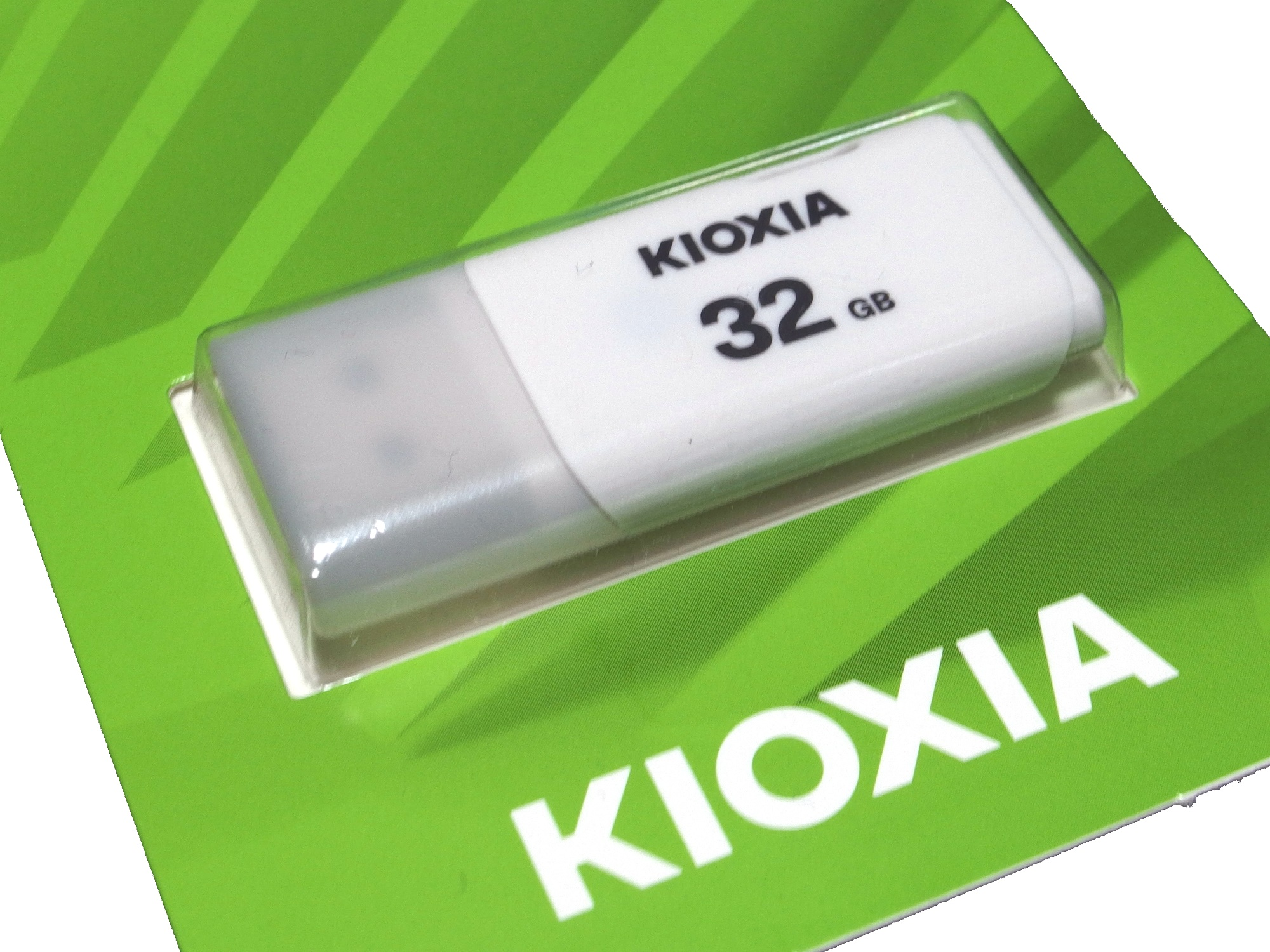
A Kioxia TransMemory USB flash drive

=== NAND flash and BiCS FLASH ===
Cross-sectional diagram of the vertical NAND structure used in Toshiba's BiCS technology

Kioxia's principal semiconductor product is NAND flash memory. Its predecessor Toshiba invented NAND flash memory in 1987 and announced three-dimensional flash-memory technology in 2007.

The company's 3D NAND technology is marketed as BiCS FLASH. Toshiba commercialized 48-layer BiCS FLASH in 2015. A 96-layer fourth-generation device was announced in 2017 and SSDs using the technology were commercialized in 2018. Kioxia announced 112-layer fifth-generation BiCS FLASH in 2020, followed by a 162-layer sixth-generation TLC device in 2021 and a QLC device in 2022. The company announced 218-layer eighth-generation BiCS FLASH in 2023 and 332-layer tenth-generation technology in 2025.

Later generations of BiCS FLASH use a CMOS directly Bonded to Array (CBA) architecture, in which the memory-cell array and CMOS circuitry are fabricated on separate wafers and bonded together. In July 2026, Kioxia began sample shipments of 1-Tbit TLC tenth-generation BiCS FLASH devices with 332 stacked word lines.

According to TrendForce, Kioxia's NAND flash revenue in the first quarter of 2026 represented 13.9% of the global market, placing it third among suppliers.

=== SSDs and XL-FLASH ===
Kioxia produces enterprise, data-center and client SSDs using its NAND flash technology.

In 2019, the company announced XL-FLASH, a low-latency storage-class memory based on BiCS FLASH and SLC technology. It is intended to address the performance gap between working memory such as DRAM and conventional flash storage. In 2022, Kioxia announced a second generation of XL-FLASH supporting multi-level-cell (MLC) operation.

== Manufacturing ==
Kioxia's principal NAND flash manufacturing sites are the Yokkaichi Plant in Mie Prefecture and the Kitakami Plant in Iwate Prefecture. In 2024, Reuters reported that Kioxia was preparing a major capacity expansion at Kitakami amid expectations of AI-driven growth in flash-memory demand, while continuing production at Yokkaichi.

The Kioxia Group manufactures flash memory in cooperation with Sandisk through three manufacturing joint operations: Flash Partners Ltd., Flash Alliance Ltd. and Flash Forward LLC. Although Kioxia holds 50.1% of the voting rights in each of the three entities, Kioxia and Sandisk have equal decision-making rights, and Kioxia accounts for them as joint operations under International Financial Reporting Standards.

The joint operations finance and procure production equipment installed at the Yokkaichi and Kitakami plants. Kioxia processes wafers using the equipment, and the three joint operations distribute 50% of their output to the Kioxia Group and 50% to the Sandisk Group.

The partnership originated with SanDisk. Western Digital acquired SanDisk in 2016, after which Western Digital became Kioxia's principal joint-production partner. Western Digital separated its flash-memory business as the independent publicly traded Sandisk Corporation in February 2025.

In January 2026, Kioxia and Sandisk extended their Yokkaichi joint-venture agreements through December 31, 2034. The Kitakami joint-venture agreement also runs through the end of 2034.

=== Yokkaichi Plant ===
The Yokkaichi Plant was established in 1992. It initially produced DRAM and began production of NAND flash memory in 1999. Toshiba withdrew from commodity DRAM production in 2001, after which NAND became the plant's principal product.

The plant expanded repeatedly as demand for NAND flash memory increased. Kioxia describes the Yokkaichi Plant as one of the world's largest flash-memory production facilities.

The Japanese government approved a subsidy of up to ¥92.9 billion in 2022 for the Kioxia–Western Digital joint investment in Yokkaichi Fab7.

=== Kitakami Plant ===
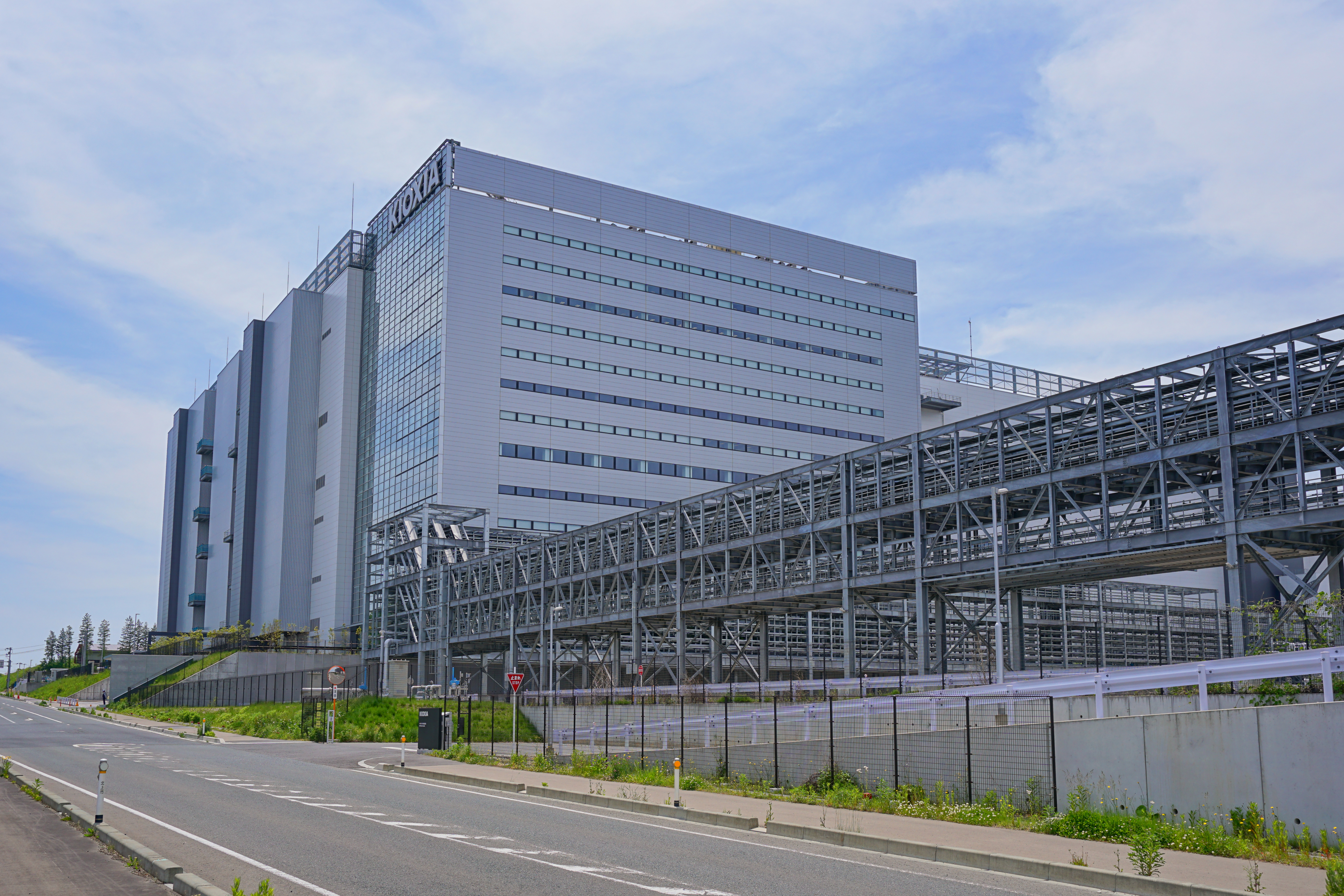
Kioxia's Kitakami Plant in Iwate Prefecture

Kioxia's Kitakami Plant is operated by Kioxia Iwate Corporation. Fab1 began operation in 2020, and Fab2 began operation in September 2025. Fab2 was built to manufacture eighth-generation 218-layer 3D flash memory and later generations.

In February 2024, the Japanese government approved subsidies of up to ¥150 billion for next-generation 3D flash manufacturing facilities at the Yokkaichi and Kitakami plants.

In July 2026, Kioxia and Sandisk began production of tenth-generation 3D flash memory at Kitakami Fab2.

== Corporate affairs ==
Kioxia Holdings Corporation is the publicly traded holding company of the Kioxia Group. It was established in March 2019 to formulate group strategy and oversee management. Kioxia Corporation, its wholly owned operating subsidiary, is responsible for the development, manufacture and sale of memory and related products.

As of March 31, 2026, the largest shareholders of Kioxia Holdings were Toshiba Corporation (17.59%), BCPE Pangea Cayman2, Ltd. (14.17%), BCPE Pangea Cayman 1A, L.P. (4.91%) and Goldman Sachs International (3.74%).

Kioxia Holdings had 15,218 employees on a consolidated basis as of March 31, 2026. Kioxia Corporation itself had 10,156 non-consolidated employees.

=== Subsidiaries and associated operations ===
Principal companies in the group include:

- Kioxia Corporation
- Kioxia Iwate Corporation
- Kioxia Systems Corporation
- Kioxia Engineering Corporation
- Kioxia America, Inc.
- Kioxia Europe GmbH
- Kioxia Singapore Pte. Ltd.
- Kioxia Korea Corporation
- Solid State Storage Technology Corporation

The group also holds a 35% interest in D.T. Fine Electronics Co., Ltd., which is accounted for as an associate.
