= Integrated device manufacturer =

Company that designs, manufactures, and sells integrated circuit products

An integrated device manufacturer (IDM) is a semiconductor company that designs and sells integrated circuit (IC) products that it manufactures at its own semiconductor fabrication plant.

Examples of IDMs are Intel, Samsung, Texas Instruments, Infineon and STMicroelectronics.

The term "IDM" is often used to refer to a company that handles all of its semiconductor manufacturing in-house, compared to a fabless semiconductor company, which outsources production to a third-party semiconductor fabrication plant.

Due to the dynamic nature of the semiconductor industry, the term IDM has become less accurate than when it was coined.

== Fabless operations ==
The terms fabless (fabrication-less), foundry, and IDM are now used to describe the role a company has in a business relationship. For example, Freescale owns and operates fabrication facilities (fab) where it manufactures many chip product lines, as a traditional IDM would. Yet it is known to contract with merchant foundries for other products, as would fabless companies.

== Manufacturers ==
Many electronic manufacturing companies engage in business that would qualify them as an IDM:

- Analog Devices (and previously Maxim Integrated Products)
- ams AG
- Changxin Memory Technologies
- CR Microelectronics
- Fujitsu
- Good-Ark Electronics
- Hitachi
- IBM (was integrated, up to 2015, then fabless)
- Infineon (and previously Cypress Semiconductor)
- Intersil (now subsidiary of Renesas)
- Intel
- LSI Corporation (acquired, not part of fabless Broadcom)
- Matsushita
- MACOM
- Microchip Technology
- Micron Technology (and previously IM Flash Technologies)
- Mitsubishi
- National Semiconductor (became part of Texas Instruments)
- Nexperia
- NXP (formerly Philips + Freescale Semiconductors)
- OMMIC (Acquired by MACOM)
- ON Semiconductor
- Qorvo
- Renesas (formerly NEC semiconductor)
- Samsung
- Shanghai Belling
- SK Hynix
- STMicroelectronics
- Sony
- Texas Instruments
- Tsinghua Unigroup
- Toshiba
- Yangtze Memory Technologies

== Reading ==
- Understanding fabless IC technology By Jeorge S. Hurtarte, Evert A. Wolsheimer, Lisa M. Tafoya 1.4.1 Integrated device manufacturer Page 8
