= Tsinghua Unigroup =

Chinese semiconductor company

Tsinghua Unigroup Co., Ltd.

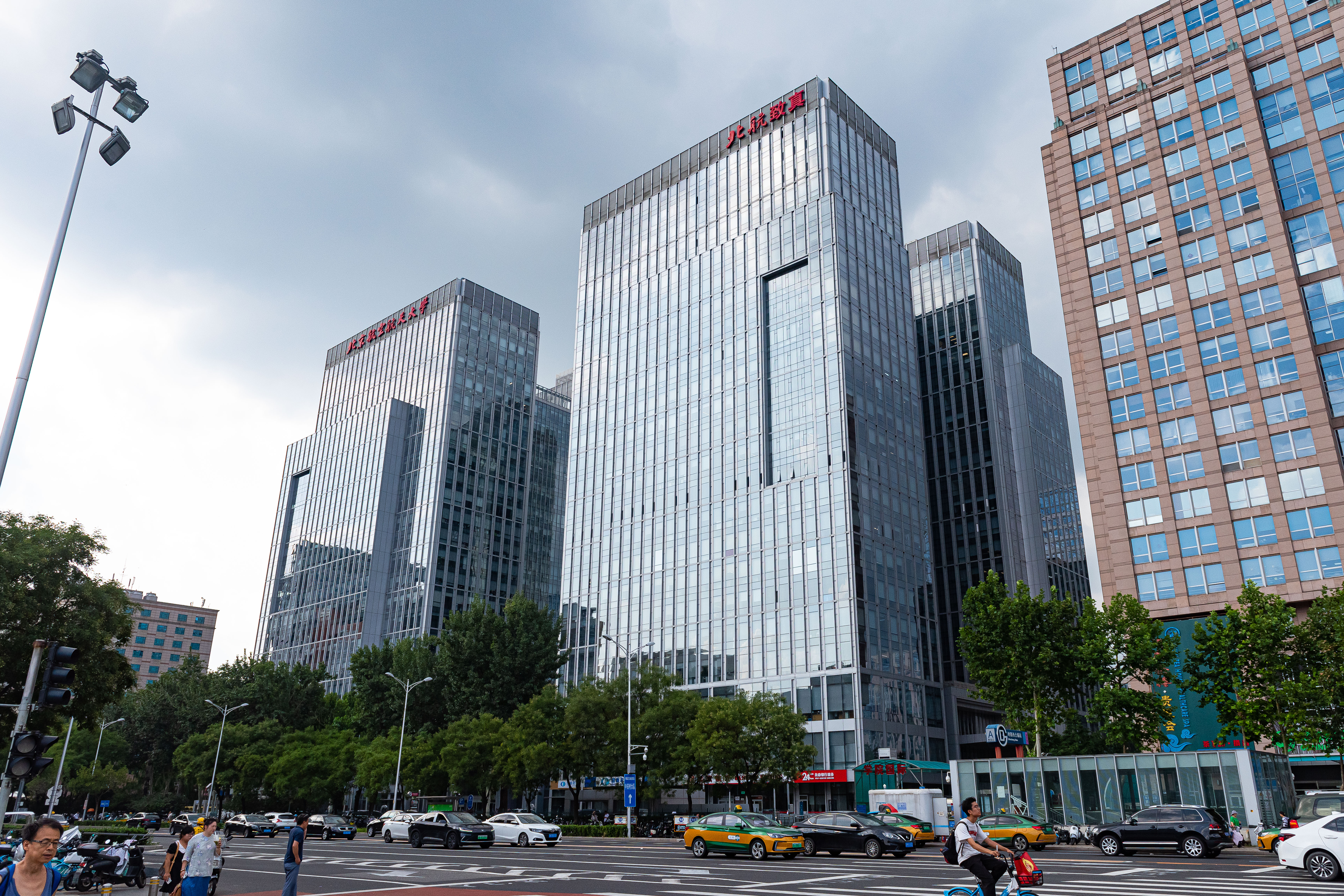
- Headquarters in Beijing
- Formerly: Tsinghua University Sci-Tech General Company
- Type: State-owned enterprise
- Industry: Semiconductors, information technology
- Founded: 1988; 38 years ago
- Founder: Tsinghua University
- Headquarters: Beijing, China
- Area served: Computer science Financial services Real estate Education
- Parent: Beijing Zhiguangxin Holding
- Subsidiaries: Guoxin Micro; Unicloud; UNISOC; Linxens; Unisplendour
- Website: www.unigroup.com.cn

Tsinghua Unigroup Co., Ltd. is a state-owned Chinese technology and semiconductor manufacturer that also supplies digital infrastructure and services to domestic and global markets. Based in Beijing, it is among the country's largest technology conglomerates; subsidiaries include UNISOC, China's largest mobile phone chip designer. Other core subsidies design and manufacture network equipment and server and storage products, and produce system integration, network security and software applications.

== Overview ==
Tsinghua Unigroup has four main subsidiaries, New H3C Technologies, UNISOC Communications Co, Guoxin Micro, and UniCloud Technology Co. Other subsidiaries include Unisplendour. and France-based Linxens, a design and manufacturing company of micro-connectors for smart cards, RFID antennas and inlays.

U.S. technology company Intel owns a 20 percent stake in Tsinghua Unigroup's UNISOC subsidiary—a consolidation of Tsinghua Unigroup acquisitions of Spreadtrum Communications, a fabless semiconductor company, and semiconductor components manufacturer RDA Microelectronics. Tsinghua Unigroup operates a joint venture with Hewlett Packard Enterprise (HPE), as H3C Technologies Co, created after Tsinghua Unigroup purchased a 51 percent stake.

== History ==
Tsinghua Unigroup was founded in 1988 as a spinoff of Tsinghua Holdings, a state-owned enterprise affiliated with Tsinghua University, a major state research university in Beijing. The company was founded as Tsinghua University Sci-Tech General Company, then renamed Tsinghua Unigroup in 1993. Tsinghua Unigroup is a fabless semiconductor company that is 51 percent owned by Tsinghua Holdings and 49 percent owned by Beijing Jiankun Investment Group; the latter is led by Tsinghua Unigroup chairman and CEO Zhao Weiguo. Zhao, a graduate of Tsinghua University, was also appointed CEO of Tsinghua Unigroup in 2009, then made board chairman in 2013. He chaired several of Tsinghua Unigroup's subsidiaries, including Unisplendour and Unigroup Guoxin Micro, until 2018. Zhao remains CEO and chairman of Tsinghua Unigroup and Yangtze Memory Technologies Co. (YMTC).

In the years 2013 and 2014, Tsinghua Unigroup undertook acquisitions that included Spreadtrum Communications, now recognized as UNISOC. Spreadtrum is a fabless semiconductor enterprise known for its mobile chipset platform development. During the same period, Tsinghua Unigroup also acquired RDA Microelectronics, a manufacturer of semiconductor components. These acquisitions resulted in the amalgamation of Spreadtrum and RDA, forming the entity known as UniSpreadtrum RDA, subsequently renamed as UNISOC. A notable development was Intel Corp.'s investment of $1.5 billion for a 20 percent stake in this venture.

In May 2015, Tsinghua Unigroup acquired a 51 percent stake in Hewlett-Packard's H3C Technologies, a China-based data-networking company, for approximately $2.3 billion. In July 2015, Tsinghua Unigroup attempted to acquire U.S. chipmaker Micron for US$23 billion. In September 2015, Western Digital announced that Unisplendour would make a US$3.775 billion equity investment to purchase its newly issued common stock, for about a 15 percent stake in the U.S. firm. Western Digital stated, in February 2016, that Unisplendour would not move forward with its offer following a decision by the Committee on Foreign Investment in the United States (CFIUS) to investigate the deal. In 2016, Tsinghua Unigroup partnered with Western Digital to establish a big data storage joint venture, Unis WDC Storage Co. in Nanjing

In 2016, Tsinghua Unigroup founded Yangtze Memory Technologies (YMTC), its IDM memory subsidiary. In 2017, Tsinghua Unigroup announced plans to build two new memory-chip factories, in Nanjing and Chengdu. Other investments include about a six percent stake in Portland, Oregon-based Lattice Semiconductor, acquired in 2017.

In June 2018, Tsinghua Unigroup acquired French smart chip components maker Linxens for a reported $2.6 billion. A restructuring proposal that would have Guoxin Micro acquire Unic Linxens (formerly Unigroup Liansheng) was rejected by the China Securities Regulatory Commission (CSRC) in June 2020. In 2018, Tsinghua Unigroup also announced the construction of a $1.9 billion Linxens plant in the Tianjin Binhai Hi-Tech Industrial Development Area in Tianjin, China. The company broke ground in September 2019, and construction of a main factory building was completed in July 2020.

=== Default and reorganization ===
On November 16, 2020, Tsinghua Unigroup defaulted on $198M in bonds, resulting in a credit downgrading from AA to BBB and triggering cross-defaults.

It emerged on July 11, 2021, that one of the creditors of Tsinghua Unigroup - Hong King-listed Huishang Bank - has requested that the company go into bankruptcy. Defaults at that time amounted to $3.6 billion for several onshore and offshore bonds. According to analysts, assets of barely $8 billion are surmounted by $30 billion in debt.

News agencies reported in January 2022 that Tsinghua Unigroup had scrapped its intention to build two major fabs announced in 2017, citing serious financial issues. The first was to be a DRAM plant in Chongqing, and the second was to be a $24 billion facility for 3D NAND flash memory in Chengdu.

On July 11, 2022, Tsinghua UniGroup has completed the registration procedures and 100% of the equity interest of Tsinghua UniGroup has been registered under Zhiguangxin.

In 2022, Beijing Zhiguangxin Holding took ownership of Tsinghua Unigroup. Beijing Zhiguangxin Holding's largest shareholder is Anhui state-owned fund Wuhu Xinhou Yunzhi Equity Investment Partnership. YMTC was separated from Tsinghua Unigroup during the restructuring and ceased to be a subsidiary of the group. Its ownership shifted to state-backed investors centered in Hubei province.

=== Corruption investigation ===
In March 2023, Tsinghua Unigroup and its CEO has been accused of corruption by the Central Commission for Discipline Inspection. The anti-fraud body accused Zhao of taking a state-owned company and using it to purchase goods and services run by his relatives and friends at prices significantly higher than the market price, leading to the company's financial issues.

In May 2025, the Chinese government convicted Zhao, the former chairman of the previously successful computer-chip conglomerate on corruption charges. He was given a suspended death sentence.

== Subsidiaries ==
In the field of technology, Tsinghua Unigroup invests mainly in Integrated Circuit design and information and communication infrastructure. Tsinghua Unigroup is the controlling shareholder of dozens of technology enterprises such as Unis, UNISOC, Guoxin Micro, Linxens, etc.

=== Guoxin Micro ===
Unigroup Guoxin Microelectronics Co., Ltd. (002049.SZ) provides IC chips for various applications such as mobilephone SIM card, finance IC card and POS machine, automotive MCU and smart connectivity IC for industry and IoT applications. In 2021, Guoxin Micro's revenue was CN¥ 5.34 billion.

=== Unicloud ===
Unicloud Technology Co., Ltd. is an industrial intelligent manufacturer that develops urban and industry cloud platforms for the construction and operation of smart cities in China.

=== UNISOC ===
UNISOC is an IC design platform company. The company's products include mobilephone central processors, baseband chips, AI chips, low-power RF chips, and other IC chips for telecommunication, computing processor and controllers. Those products are used in consumer electronics and Internet of Things. In 2021, it gained an operating revenue of CN¥ 11.7 billion.

=== Linxens ===
Linxens is a smart chips components maker specializing in security and identification, such as flexible connectors used in smart cards and RFID antennas and inlays. In 2018, Tsinghua Unigroup, through its subsidiary Unigroup Liansheng, acquired Linxens for about US$2.6 billion. Founded in 1979, Linxens is headquartered in Levallois-Perret, France and, as of 2018, employs over 3,200 staff at nine production sites worldwide. It also has offices in China, Singapore and Thailand, and operates six R&D centers. In June 2019, Guoxin Micro announced a plan to acquire Unigroup Liansheng, including its main asset, Linxens. However, the deal was rejected by the Chinese securities regulator the following year. Following Tsinghua Unigroup's financial collapse and the appointment of joint liquidators in 2022, ownership of Linxens passed to entities linked to Wise Road Capital and JAC Capital, two Beijing-based private equity firms both listed on the United States Department of Commerce Entity List.

In May 2026, the Financial Times reported that Linxens supplies blank inlays to Thales, the defense company contracted by the UK Home Office to provide British passports, raising concerns about the security of critical national infrastructure.

In May 2026, the High Court of Justice of the Virgin Islands ruled that a US$125.9 million repayment made by Tsinghua Unigroup International Co., Ltd to Linxens Holding SAS on 7 December 2020 — three days before the bond default — constituted an unfair preference under the BVI Insolvency Act 2003. The court found that the company was "plainly hopelessly cash flow insolvent" at the time of the payment and ordered it to be set aside.

=== Unisplendour (UNIS) ===
Unisplendour Corporation Limited is a provider of full-stack ICT infrastructure. It provides services for digitization, networking, computing, cloud computing, and smart terminals. Its subsidiary companies include H3C Technologies Co., Limited. Unisplendour Digital (Suzhou) Group Co., Ltd. and Unicompute Technology Co., Ltd., etc.

== Former subsidiaries ==
=== Yangtze Memory Technologies ===
Yangtze Memory Technologies (YMTC) is a Wuhan-based semiconductor manufacturer specializing in 3D NAND flash memory. Tsinghua Unigroup established YMTC in 2016 together with investors including the Hubei provincial government and the China Integrated Circuit Industry Investment Fund.

YMTC was separated from Tsinghua Unigroup during the group's 2022 restructuring and ceased to be a subsidiary of Unigroup. Its ownership subsequently shifted to state-backed investors centered in Hubei province.
