= Tsinghua Tongfang =

Chinese state-owned software company

Tsinghua Tongfang Co., Ltd.
- Native name: 清华同方股份有限公司
- Type: Public; State-owned enterprise
- Traded as: SSE: 600100
- Industry: Information technology, energy, environment
- Founded: 1997; 29 years ago
- Headquarters: Beijing, China
- Area served: China, United States
- Key people: Rong Yonglin (chairman)
- Owner: China National Nuclear Corporation; Tsinghua Holdings
- Website: www.thtf.com.cn

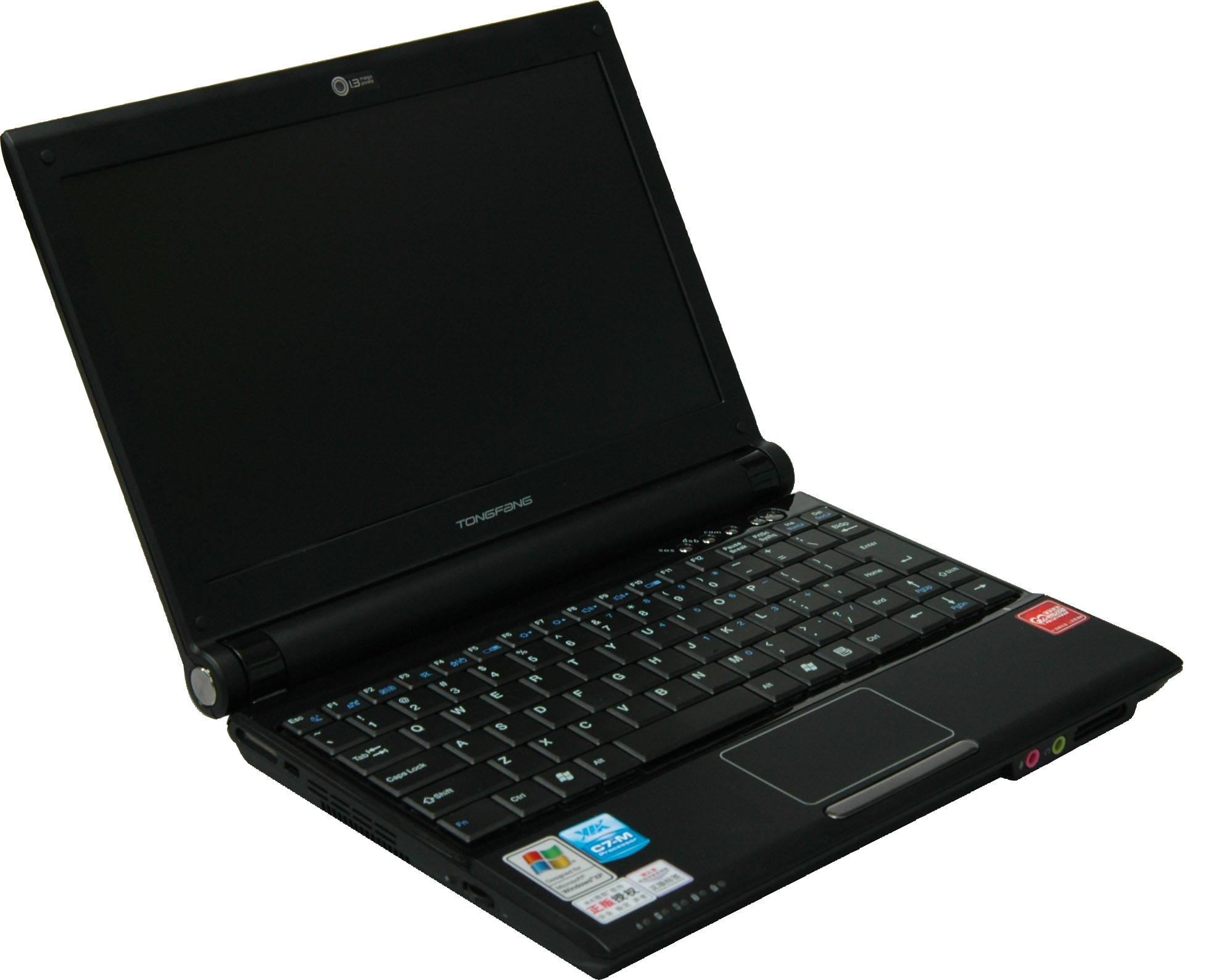
Tongfang laptop

Tsinghua Tongfang Co., Ltd. is a publicly traded state-owned enterprise headquartered in Beijing, China, which operates in various sectors including consumer electronics, information technology, and energy and environmental industries. The company was established in 1997 and was listed on the Shanghai Stock Exchange the same year. In 2019, China National Nuclear Corporation became the controlling shareholder of Tsinghua Tongfang.

Tsinghua Tongfang manufactures its own in-house brand of televisions under the brand THTF.

== Investment ==
Tongfang builds industry chains with focus on two major business: information industry and energy environment industry. The company's activities primarily encompass the production and service of products such as PCs, LED chips, security systems, digital TVs, digital city solutions, and environmental protection technologies.

Tongfang's investment is mainly concentrated on North China, covering all large cities in China, and its investment overseas continues to expand. Tongfang entered a period of rapid growth in the year of 2007.

Besides its continued investment in PC, container inspection system, environmental protection technology in recent years, it also has enlarged the investment in high-tech products, like LED chip, RFID, digital TV and e-government, making its investment projects scattered.

== Former employees ==
- Hu Haiqing
