= Economy of Changsha =

Changsha is one of the most developed cities and economic centres in China. Changsha's GDP was 932.37 billion RMB in 2016, a year-on-year growth of 9.4% from the previous year, which would rank it No.13 in the country. Its GDP per capita was 123,681 RMB, an increase of 7.0% from the previous year. Changsha's primarily, secondary, and tertiary industries were worth 37.95 billion RMB, 451.323 billion RMB, and 443.952 billion RMB. In 2013, the financial news portal Yicai.com published its first edition of a list of ranking cities in China, with Changsha being included as one of 15 new first-tier cities. In 2017, Changsha made its way into the 1-trillion-yuan GDP club with its GDP of 1.02 trillion RMB, becoming the 13th city in China with a GDP of one trillion yuan (154 billion US dollars). In 2021, Changsha's GDP (nominal) was 1.32 trillion yuan (208 billion US dollars) with its per capita over $20,000 (nominal) and over $30,000 (PPP), which is considered as a high-income status by the World Bank and a primary developed city according to the international standard.

== Agricultural production ==
Agricultural production of Changsha has shied from traditional mode to modern mode. The four industrial belts of grains, tea, flowers and aquatic products have formed a certain scale. Changsha is committed to giving full play to the advantages of rice industry, aiming to build international rice capital. In the whole year of 2016, the agriculture, forestry, animal husbandry and fishery of Changsha realized on increase of RMB 58,360,000,000. The grain planting area of the whole year was 3,730 km^{2} (1,440 sq mi) of which the planting area of paddy was 3,360 km^{2} (1,300 sq mi). The planting area of high quality paddy accounted for 78.8%, that of vegetables was 1,720 km^{2} (660 sq mi), that of oil plants was 5,600 km^{2} (2,200 sq mi), a rise of 1.1%, and the number of pigs ready for slaughter was 737,680,000. The yields of its major agricultural products remained stable. There were 5689 agricultural product processing enterprises in Changsha, of which 76 were state-level or provincial-level enterprises. There were 7,273 farmers' specialized cooperative organizations, the number of the farmers registered in organizations was 167,200, and the number of the farmers that got involved was 331,900. The total power of agricultural machinery reached 595.9 kilowatts, the total cost of agricultural machinery was RMB 2,998,000,000 and the machinized planting and harvest for rice accounted for 75.7%.

== Secondary industry ==
=== Engineering machinery industry ===
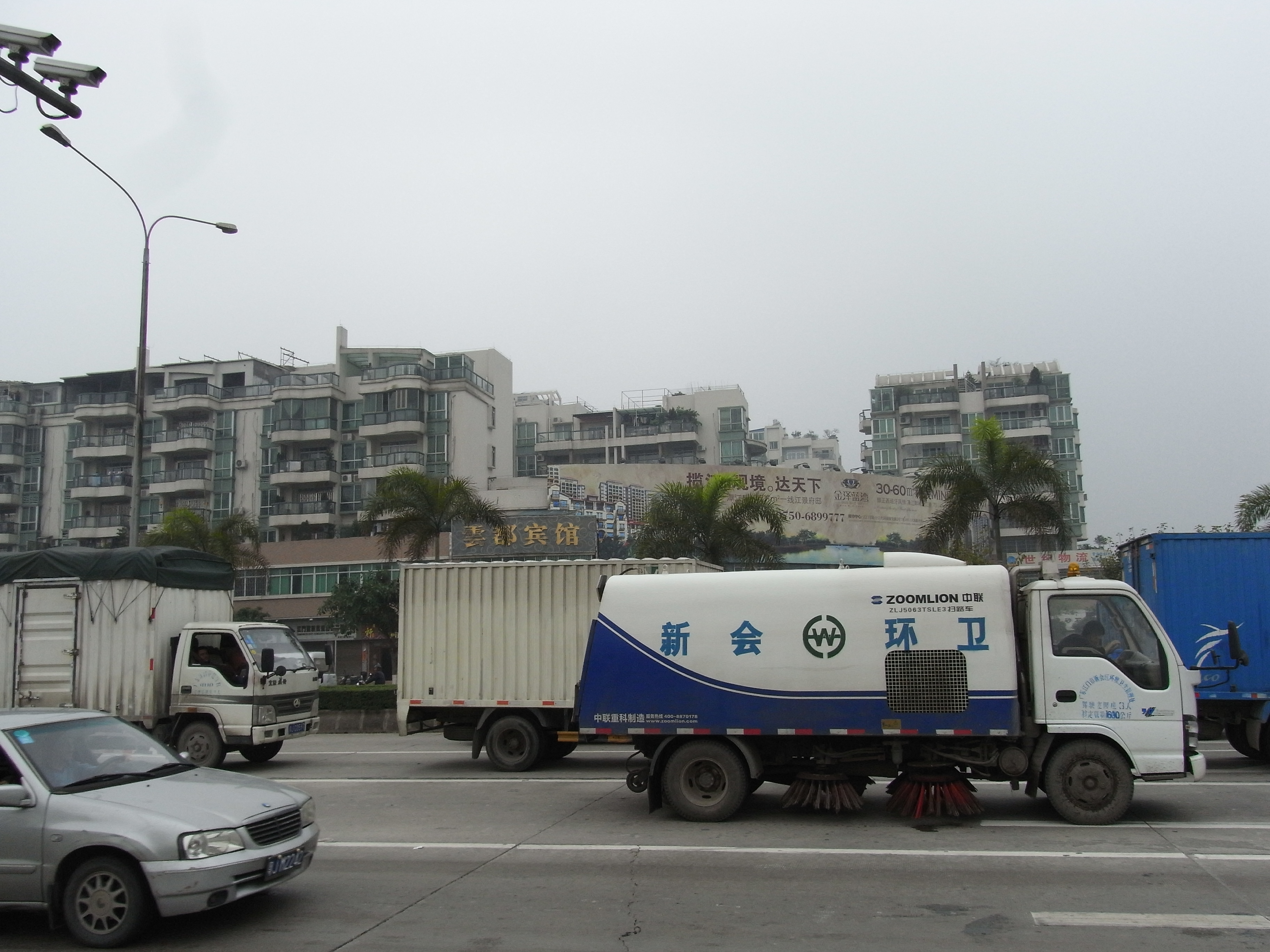
A Zoomlion road sweeper.

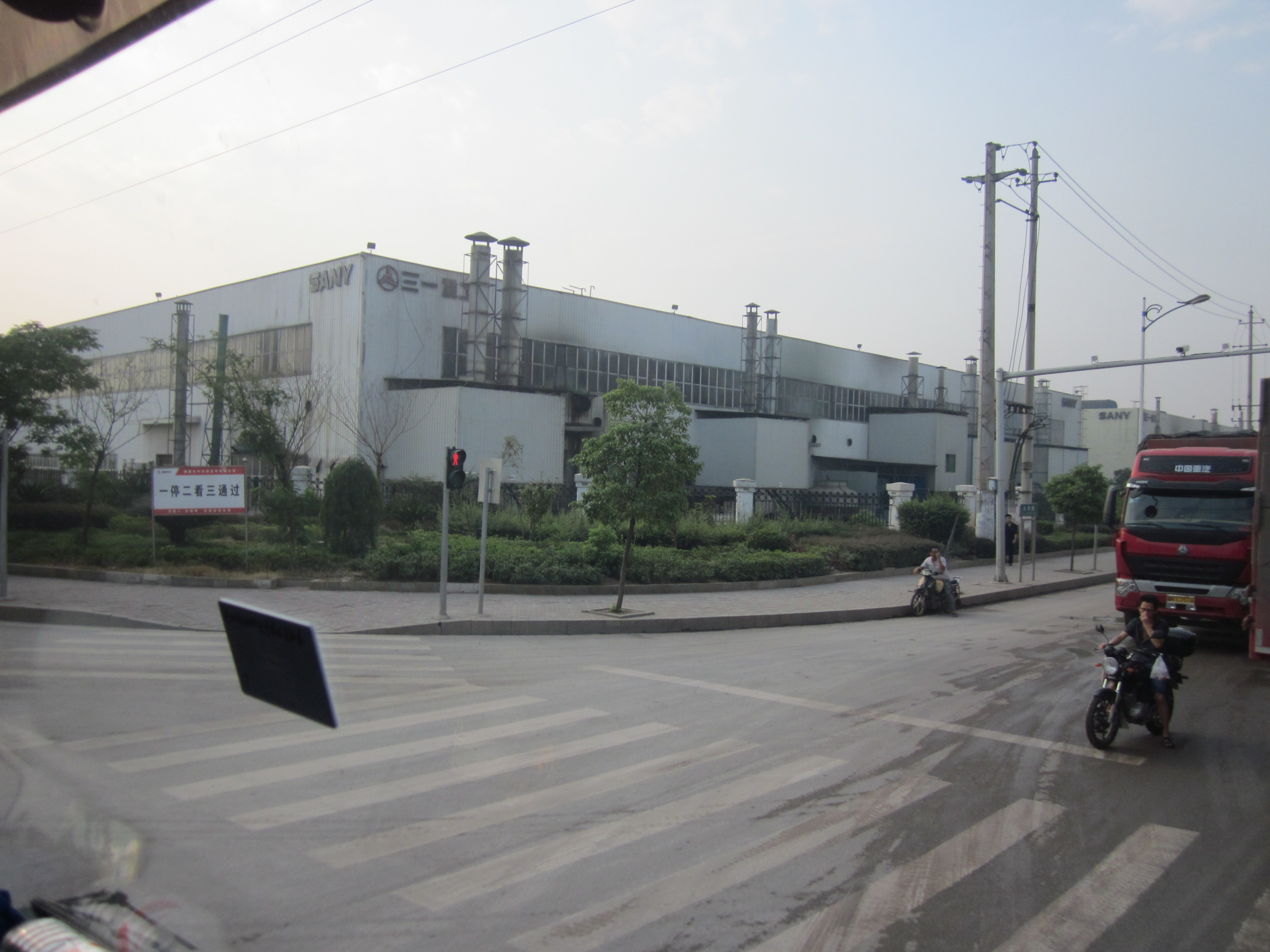
The Sany factory in Loudi, Hunan province.

The engineering machinery industry of Changsha started from the end of the 1970s. With the rapid development of more than 30 years and led by the leading enterprise like Zoomlion, Sany Group, Sunward Intelligent Equipment (Sunward UAV), the industry keeps expanding. The overall economic performance of the industry is above the average level of China. In 2014, the output of industrial enterprises above designated size accumulated to RMB 180,700,000,000 and it became the biggest engineering machinery production and manufacturing base that had the capacity of independent R&D and manufacturing of high-end and large-size products. So far, over 400 models of products that fell in over 100 sub-categories and 12 categories have been produced by the engineering machinery industry of Changsha, accounting for 70% of all varieties of the national engineering machinery. Many enterprises, represented by Zoomlion, Sany Group, Sunward Intelligent Equipment and others, took an active stance in expanding their overseas business and speeding up overseas investment, merger and acquisition, and gradually became large-scale engineering machinery manufacturing enterprise groups with world-class competitiveness.

=== Electronic information industry ===
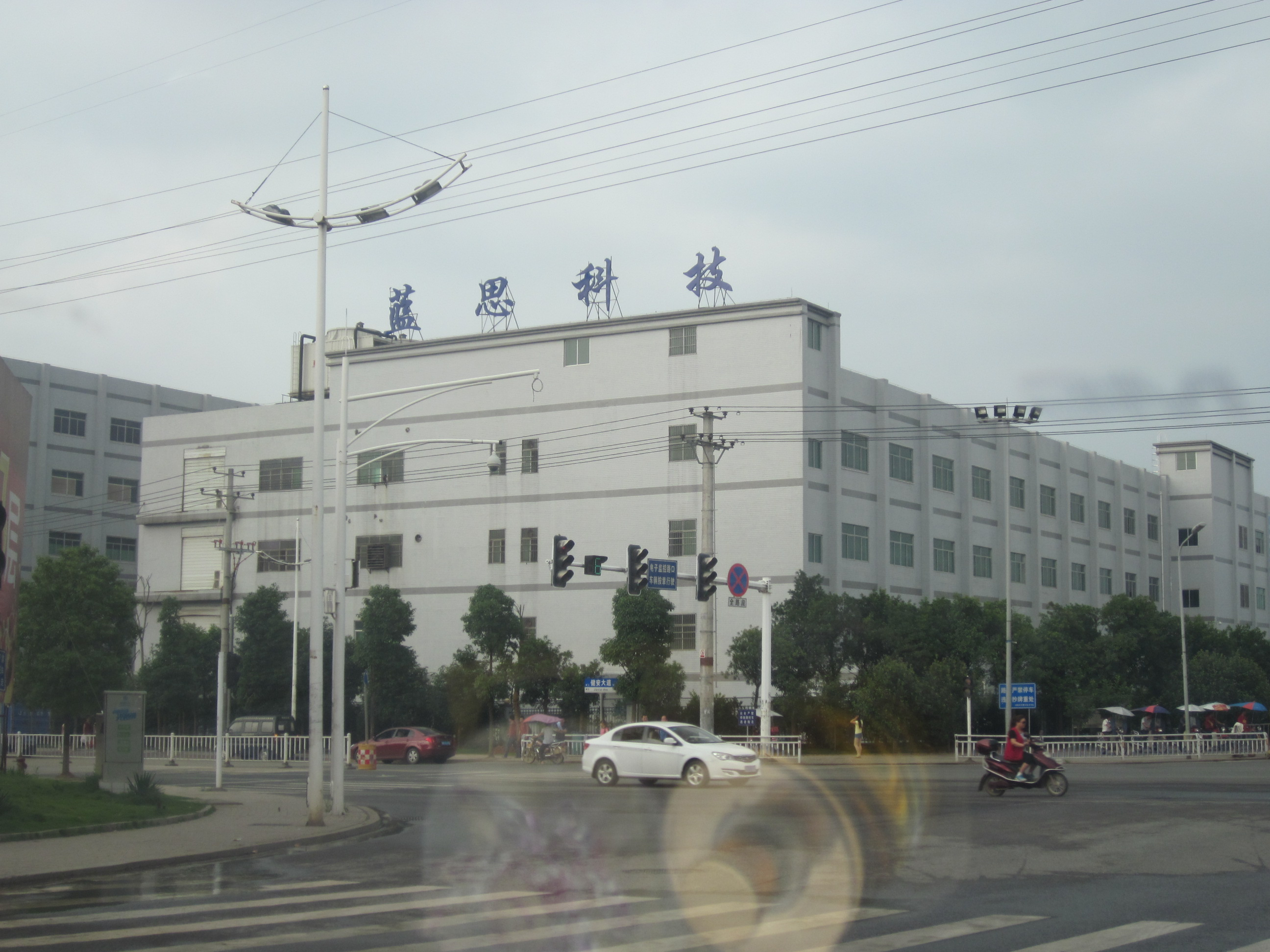
Lens Technology in Liuyang, Hunan, China.

Changsha has brought together over 1800 electronic information enterprises. In 2014, the output of Changsha's electronic information industry was RMB 150,000,000,000, a rise of 28% year-on-year. Over 10 Fortune Global 500 enterprises like Microsoft, IBM, Motorola, Cisco, Dell, Ericsson, Foxconn, Hitachi and Harris have gathered here. A wide range of industry (represented by 58 daojia, Talkweb, Longtu Game and Shanlingyuanshang), a Beidou satellite application industry (represented by Greatwall Information Industry, Hangtiandianzi, Garland Gai & Tech), an integrated circuit industry (represented by No. 48 Institute of CETC, Goke Microelectronics, Jingjia Micro, Zhonghui Microelectronics and Ronghe Microelectronics), an intelligent terminal industry (represented by Lens Technology, Newsmy, Success Electronics and Jtouch), and a modern information service industry (represented by Greon Apple Pata Center, Yunqi Network and China Mobile E-commerce).

=== Material industry ===
The overall level of Changsha's material disciplinary cluster ranks among the top of China and it enjoys the reputation of "Changsha school of Metallic Materials" in international academic circles. It has 3 national key material laboratories, 4 state-level engineering technology centers, 1 state-level engineering research center, national base for achievement transformation and industrialization of new materials in China. So far, 5 industry chains oriented by nonferrous material, fine chemical material and green construction material and featured by energy storage material and carbon material have come into being: Presently, there are over 450 enterprises above designated size, which mainly gathered at Changsha High-Tech Industrial Development Zone, Ningxiang Economic and Technological Development Zone, Wangcheng Economic and Technological Development Zone and other industry parks. In 2014, the total value of output amounted to RMB 190,000,000,000. A wide range of the leading enterprises, featured by different scales and with output value of RMB 10,000,000,000, RMB 5,000,000,000, RMB 3,000,000,000 and RMB 1,000,000,000, has preliminary taken shape.

=== Automobile and parts industry ===
Changsha's automotive industry started from the 1960s and when it came into the 21st century, Changsha has gradually become one of the important automobile production bases of China. By 2014, there have been over 100 enterprises above designated size specialized in automobile and spare parts (of which 10 enterprises engaged in vehicle production), and vehicle production covered 6 categories: car, light-mid-heavy duty truck, off-road vehicle, special-purpose vehicle, passenger car and new energy automobile. The automobile industry cluster based on "Two districts, two parks one corridor" and centered on the 6 categories of vehicles preliminarily took shape. Changsha now has become the first city of China that has the capacity of manufacturing all categories of automobiles. According to statistics, in 2014, the automobile industry of the city kept a stable growth.

=== Biopharmaceutical industry ===
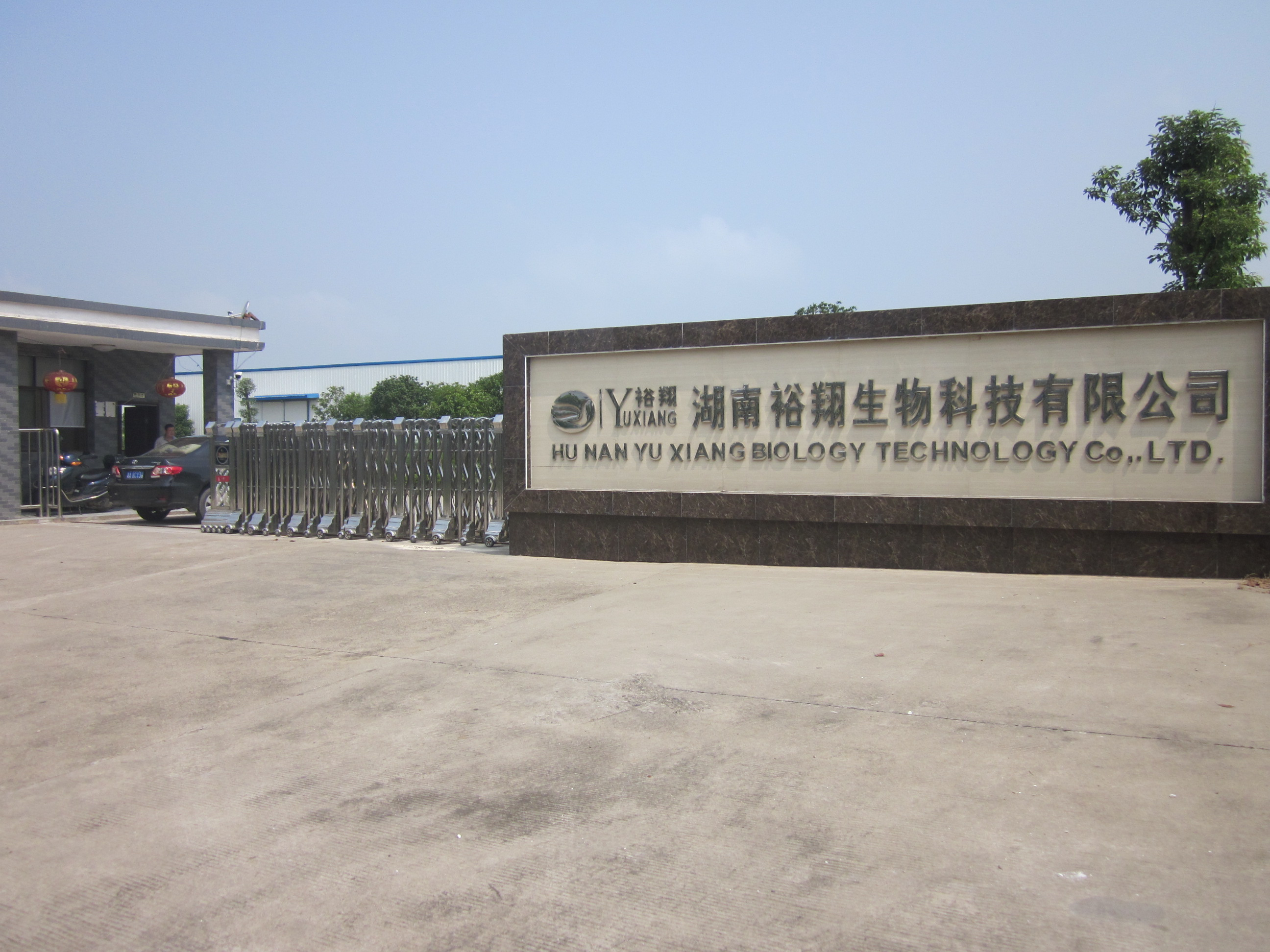
Hunan Yuxiang Biology Technology Co,.LTD.

After years of development and agglomeration, Changsha has developed Liuyang Economic and Technological Development Zone, Changsha High-Tech Industrial Development Zone and Jinxia High-Tech Industrial Development Zone for its biopharmaceutical industry, introducing and fostering a great batch of growth-type enterprises featuring promising market prospect, high technology and strong momentum of development including Hunan Jiuzhitang Co., Ltd, Hunan Jiudian Co., Ltd and Ang Pharmace-utical Co., Ltd.

The capacity of Changsha to support the industry has been greatly enhanced. Changsha's biopharmaceutical industry is composed of modern Chinese medicine, basic engineeringandmodern seeding. The modern Chinese medicine processing technology and modern seeding technology are among the leading ones of the central region. In 2014, there are over 170 biopharmaceutical manufacturing enterprises in Changsha, of which 66 enterprises were above designated size, 4 were listed ones and 11 had an output value of over RMB 100,000,000. A total of 1504 drug varieties were produced.

=== Foodstuff industry ===
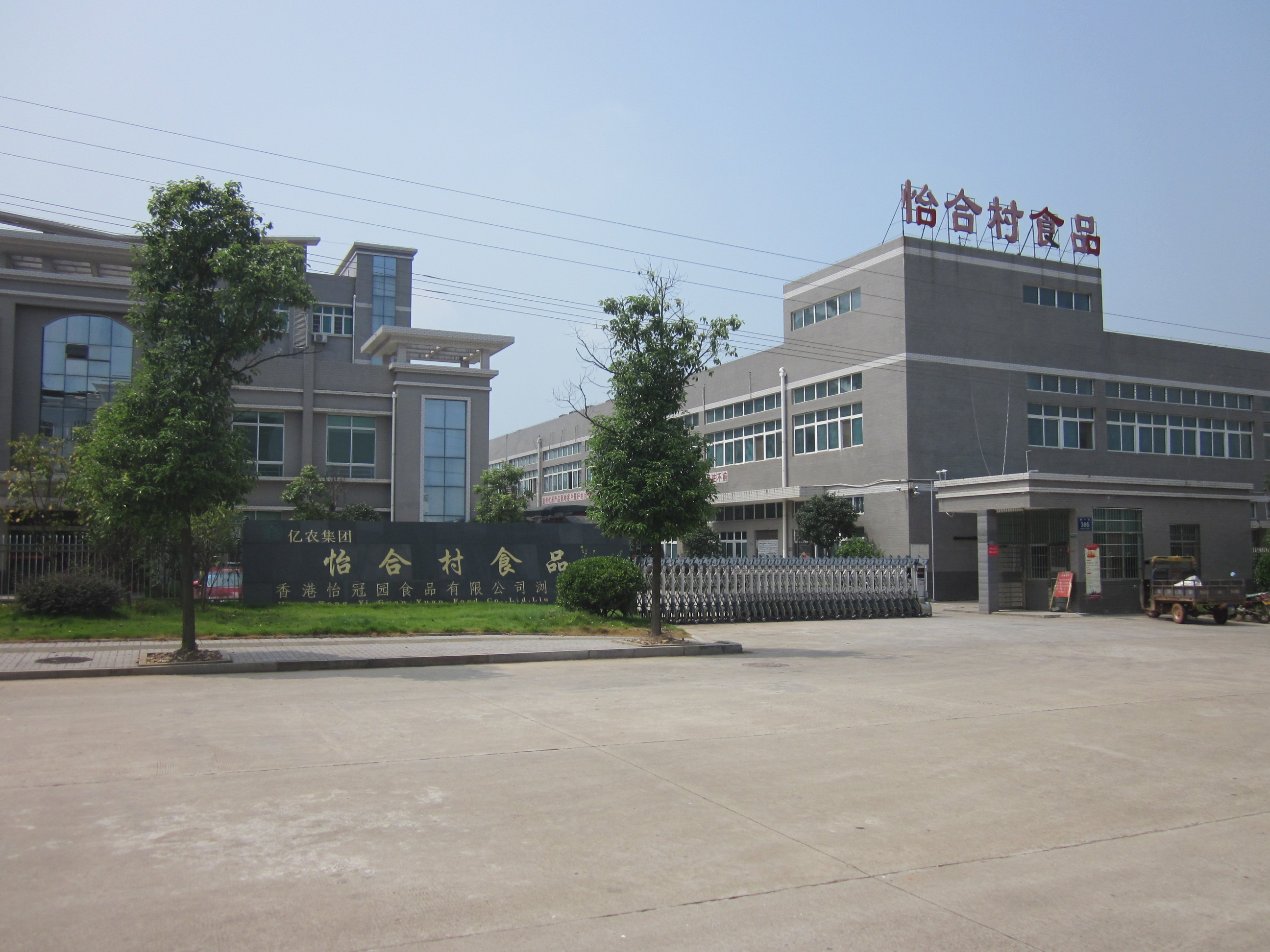
Yihecun Food in Liuyang.

As the new-type industrialization process moves forward continuously, Changsha's foodstuff and tobacco industry has taken shape, developed and gradually become a dominant industry of Changsha. So far, four major clusters: Ningxiang, Liuyang, Wangcheng District and Longping High-Tech Industrial Development Zone have taken shape preliminary, getting together 12 sub-industries including tobacco product, dairy product, meat processing, grain and oil processing, seasoning, wines, drinks, tea, snack food, health food, food processing and other agricultural and sideline product processing sectors. In 2014, there are 271 food production enterprises above designated size, of which 136 enterprises had an annual.value of production over RMB 100,000,000 and 8 enterprises exceeded RMB 1,000,000,000. Its total value of industrial output amounted to RMB 151,000,000,000, a rise of 10.7% and it realized an industrial added value of RMB 83,500,000,000, up 8.7%.

== Tertiary industry ==
Changsha is featuring obvious consumption characteristics and profound cultural deposits. In recent years, it has accelerated the pace of taking the lead in building a well-off society on all fronts and basically achieving modernization. The city has also promoted strategic adjustment of industries and energetically developing modern service industry and producer services. The territory sector has maintained a steady and rapid growth. In 2014, the city's territory industry added value reached RMB 326.109 billion, accounting for 41.7% of GDP. While the consumer services like wholesale and retail business, hotel and catering industry and real estate keeping a steady development, the producer services such as transportation and warehousing industry, postal industry, financial industry, information transmission software and information technology service, renting service and commercial service, scientific research and technical service has achieved a rapid development. Changsha has been awarded the honorable titles of the National Pilot City of Modern Services, China's Model City for Service Outsourcing and China's Top Ten Exhibition Brand City.

=== Press and publication ===
After several years of industry upgrading and capital expansion, Hunan's publishing sector, reputed as "Publishing Hunan Army" (Chinese: 出版湘军), becomes more highly competitive now. The popular science books and classical works maintain first in the sales volume for years. In 2014, five kinds of books were on the bestseller list of Kaijuan (Chinese: 《开卷》). Meanwhile, with the rapid development of digital publishing industry, many leading enterprises including China South Publishing and Media Group (Chinese: 中南出版传媒集团), Hunan VOC (Chinese: 华声在线), and Mango Media sprang up. A host of major projects like the Huawen historical newspaper and literature database and the China Unicom reading base have been set up. The city also established the central south national digital publishing base.

=== Performing arts culture ===
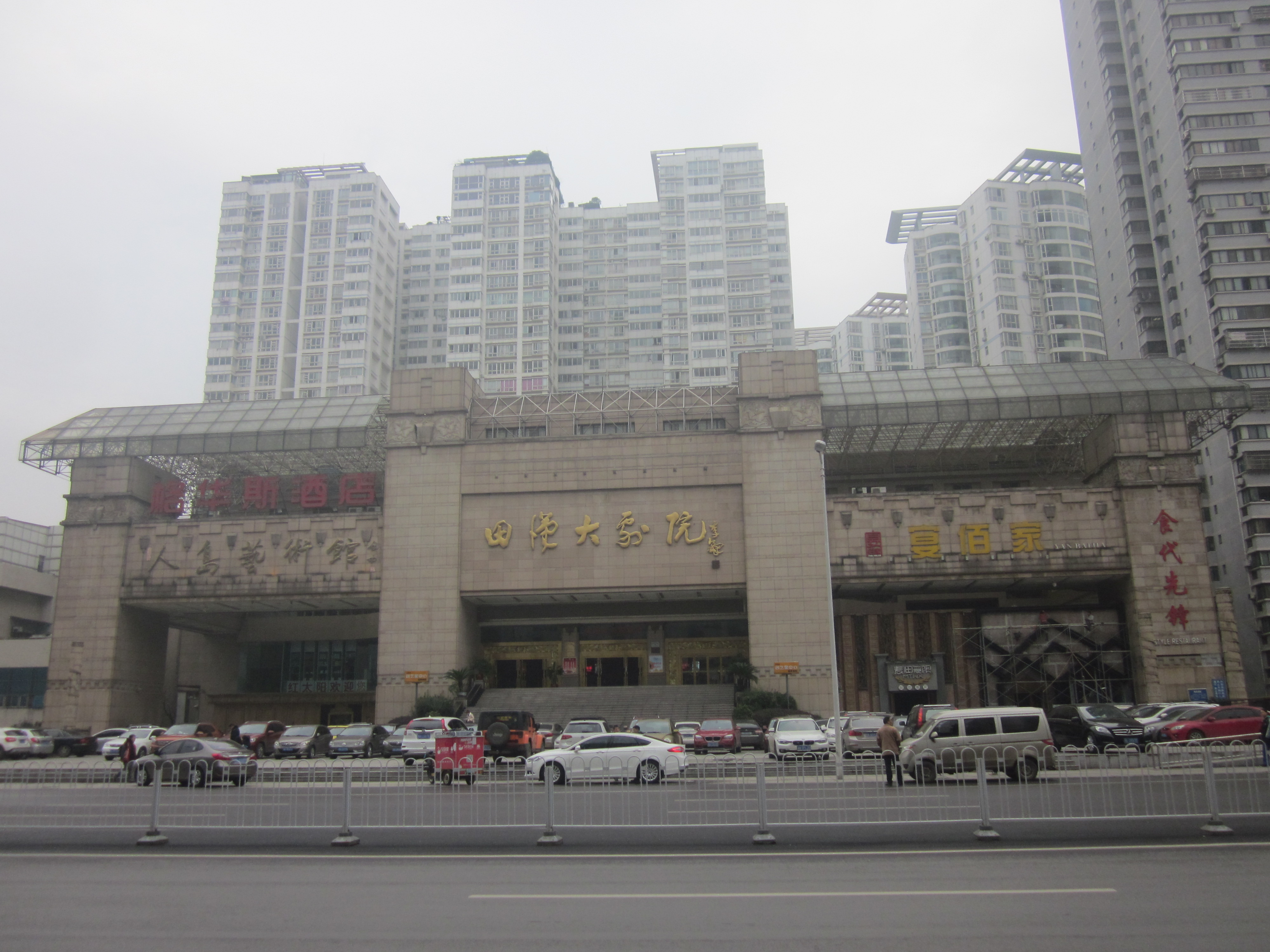
The Tian Han Grand Theatre.

Changsha performing arts center is the original music teahouse in 1986, the Changsha's first performing arts center made the debut. Up to now, the performing arts culture has become a new name card of Changsha's leisure and entertainment industry.

=== Catering ===
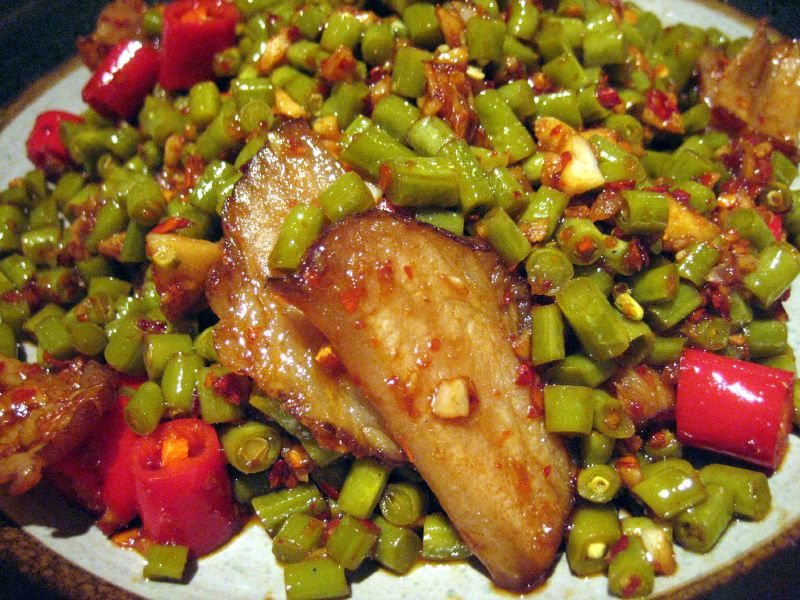
Hunan cured ham with pickled yardlong beans.

Hunan cuisine, one of the eight great traditional Chinese cuisines, is well-known for its greasy taste, striking color, especially standing out in acid, spicy flavor, fresh aroma, and smoked and cured food. As the center of Hunan cuisine, Changsha is a popular destination for gourmets, offering both traditional and innovative dishes.

=== Pub ===
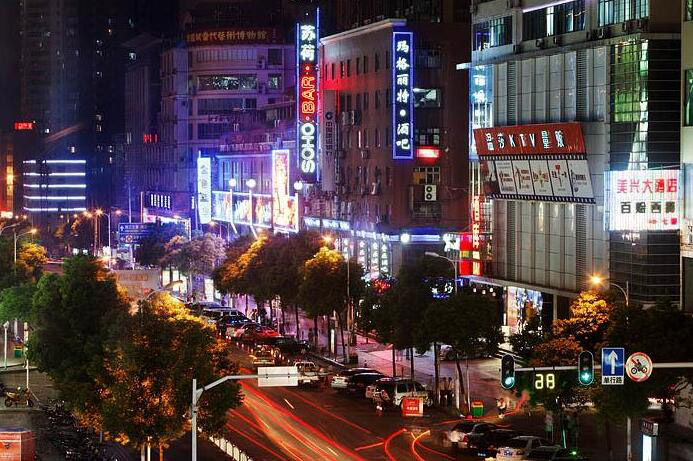
Changsha Business Quarter in the West Road.

Pub is an important element of Changsha, which is regarded as the capital of leisure and recreation. Currently, pubs in Changsha are mainly concentrated in three distinctive blocks named the West Jiefang Road (Chinese: 解放西路), Hualongchi (Chinese: 化龙池) and Taiping Streets (Chinese: 太平街) respectively. Pubs featuring art performance are mainly in the West Jiefang Road, becoming the popular "pub street" all over the city by integrating the pub culture and art performance culture. While pubs in Hualongchi and Taiping Streets are famous for their delicacy and sentiment and they could provide a great atmosphere of peace, relaxation and comfort.

=== Animated works ===
Starting the animation industry in the early 1990s, Changsha known as the pioneer of China's original animation, is one of the earliest cities to develop it all over China. More than 150 animation companies cluster in Changsha, where a complete industrial system covering research and development, production, distribution, broadcasting and derivative product development has been formed. Some of China's most popular animated figures like Bule cat, Homer, Shanmao were produced there.

=== Tourism ===
Surrounded by mountains and waters, Changsha boasts beautiful landscape, long-standing history and rich tourism resources. The city has two national 5A level tourist attractions, namely Yuelu Mountain and Orange Isle Scenic Region and Huaminglou and Former Residence of Liu Shaoqi Scenic Region. Besides, a number of national 4A level tourist attractions including Window of the World in Changsha, Hunan Provincial Museum, Tianxin Pavilion, Lei Feng Memorial, Dawei Mountain National Forest Park, and Jinggang Ancient Town. Approximately 124.5 million visitors contributed an estimated 153.483 billion to the local economy in 2016. Over 1.215 million international visitors come to Changsha every year.

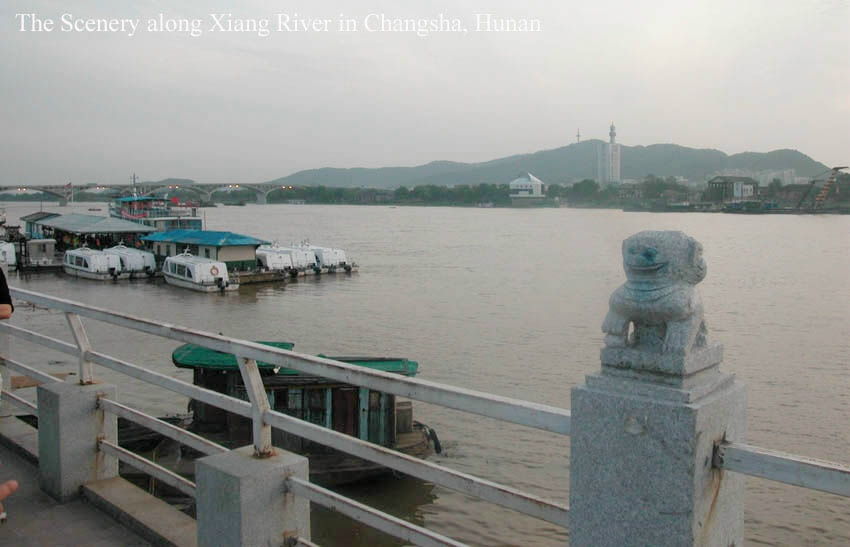
Mount Yuelu in Yuelu District.

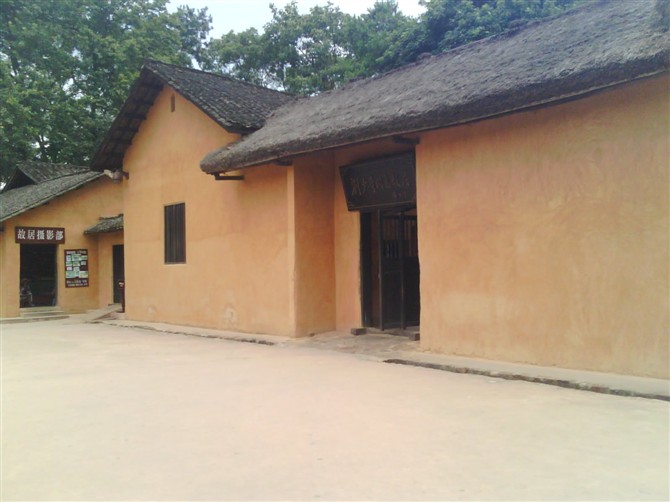
Former Residence of Liu Shaoqi in the town of Huaminglou of Ningxiang.

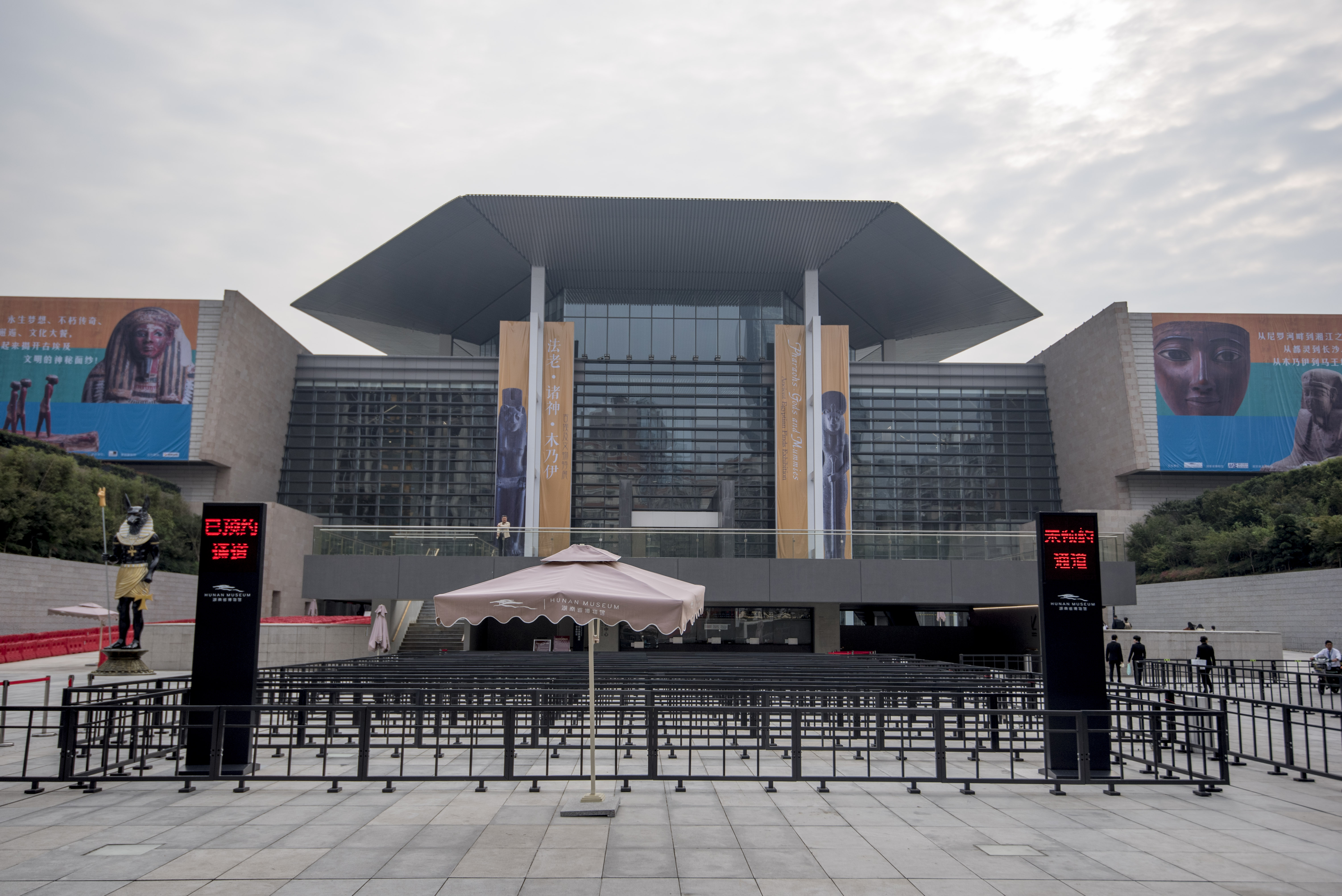
Hunan Provincial Museum.

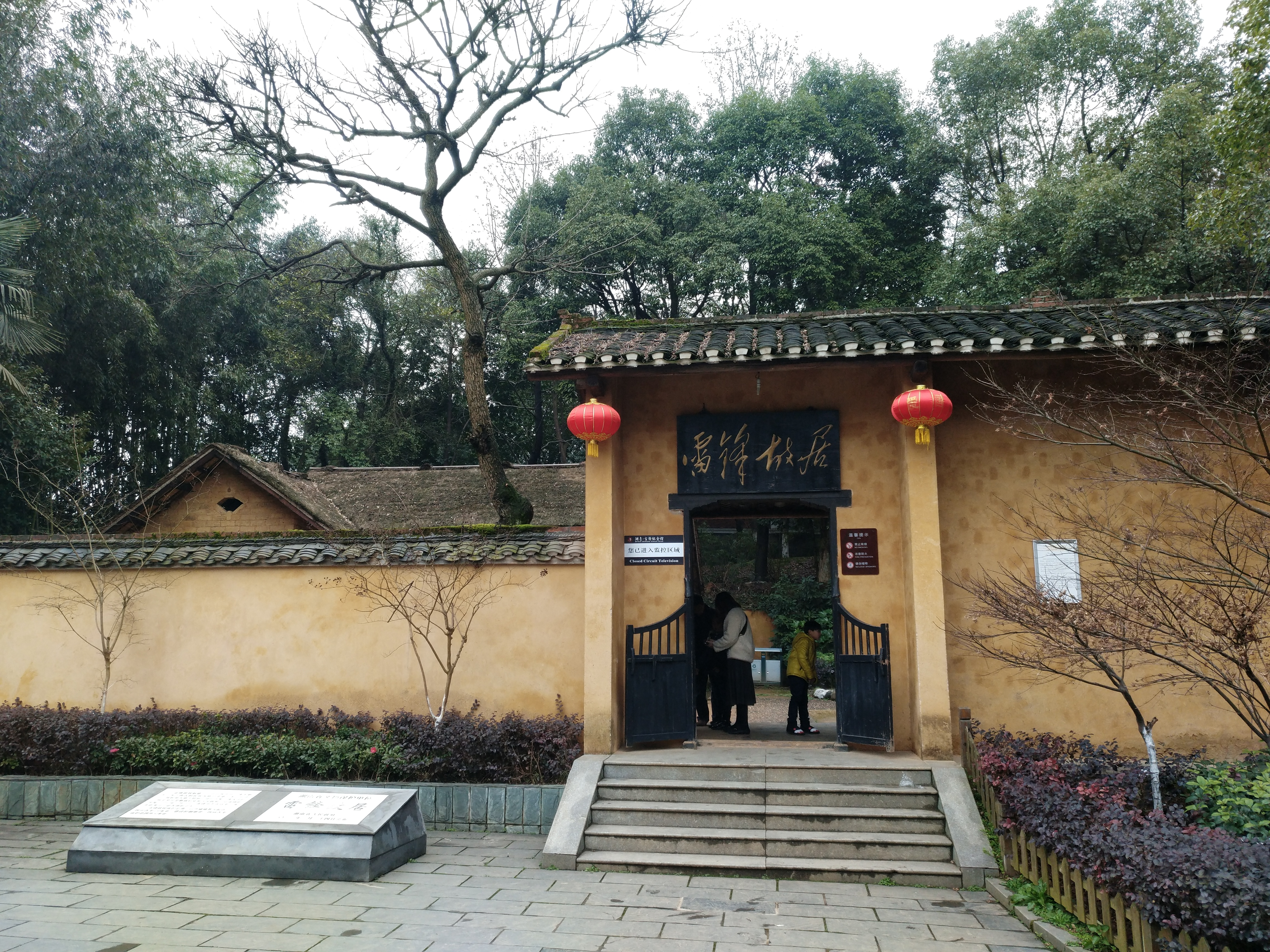
Entrance of the Former Residence of Lei Feng.

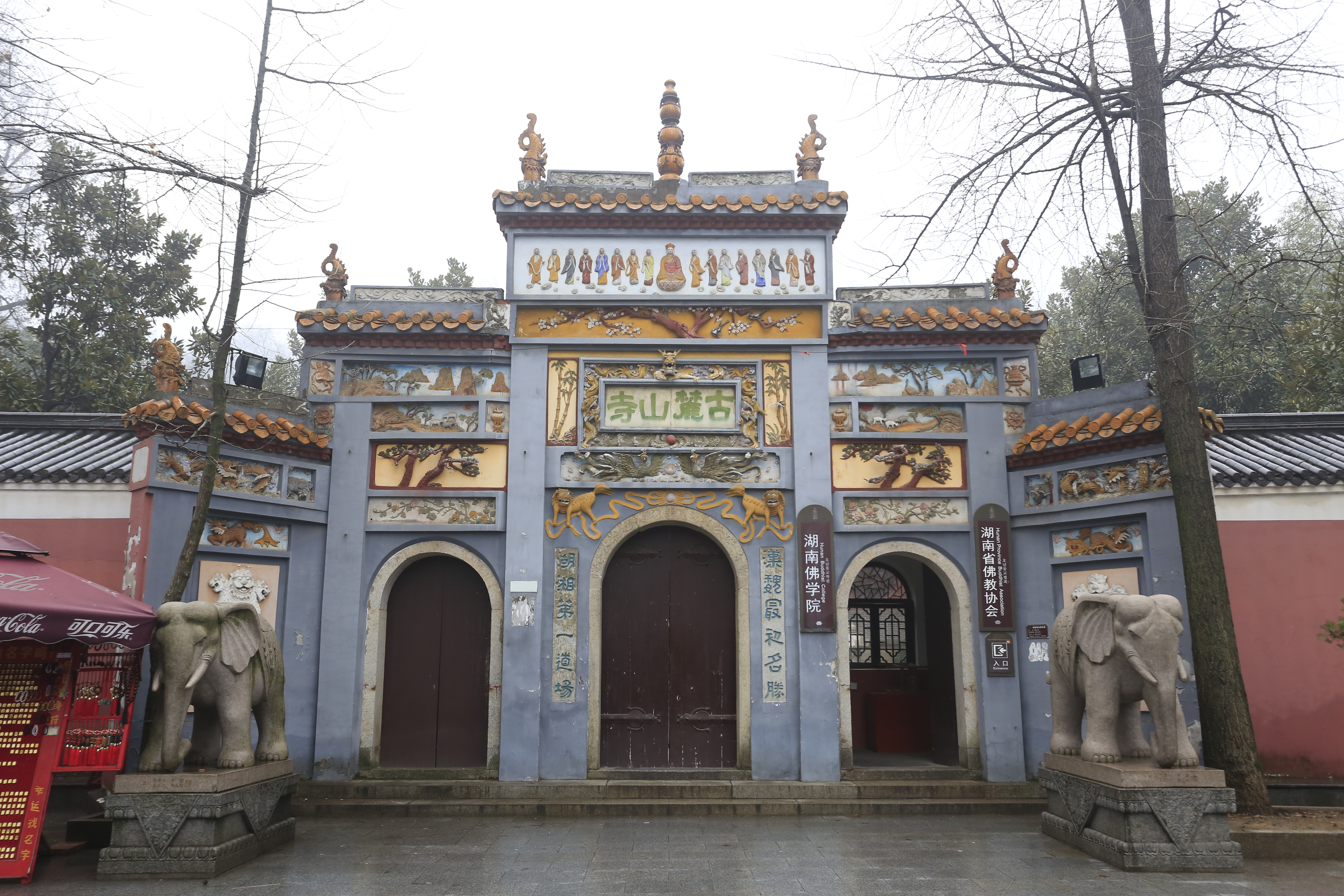
The Lushan Temple in Mount Yuelu.

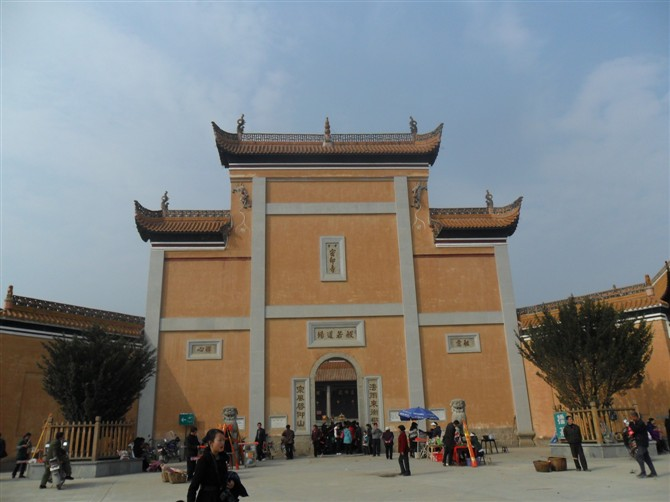
The Miyin Temple in Weishan Township, Ningxiang.

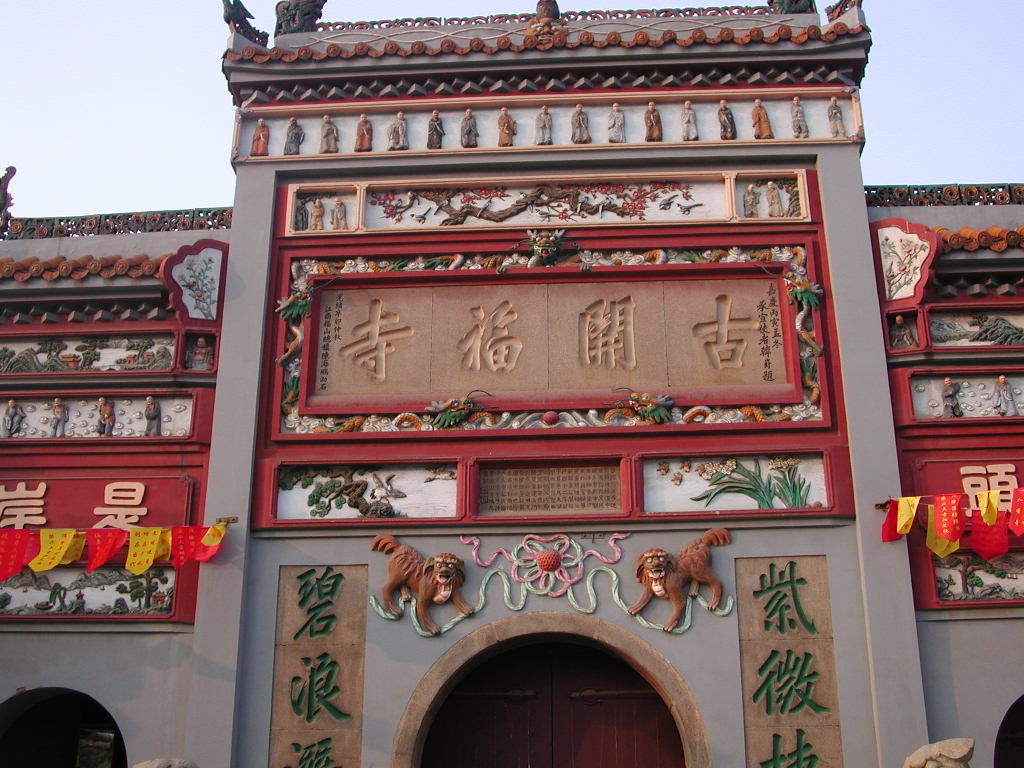
The Kaifu Temple in Kaifu District.

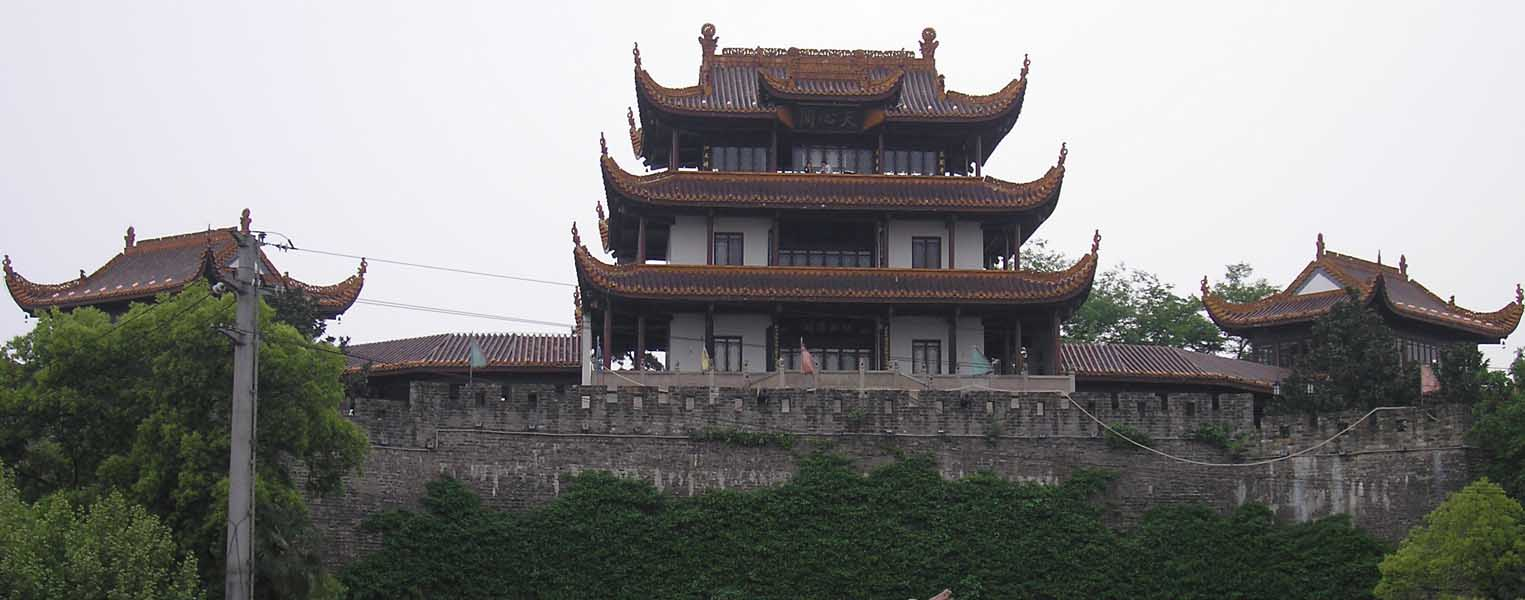
Tianxin Pavilion.
