= Vaiśravaṇa =

Deity in Buddhism

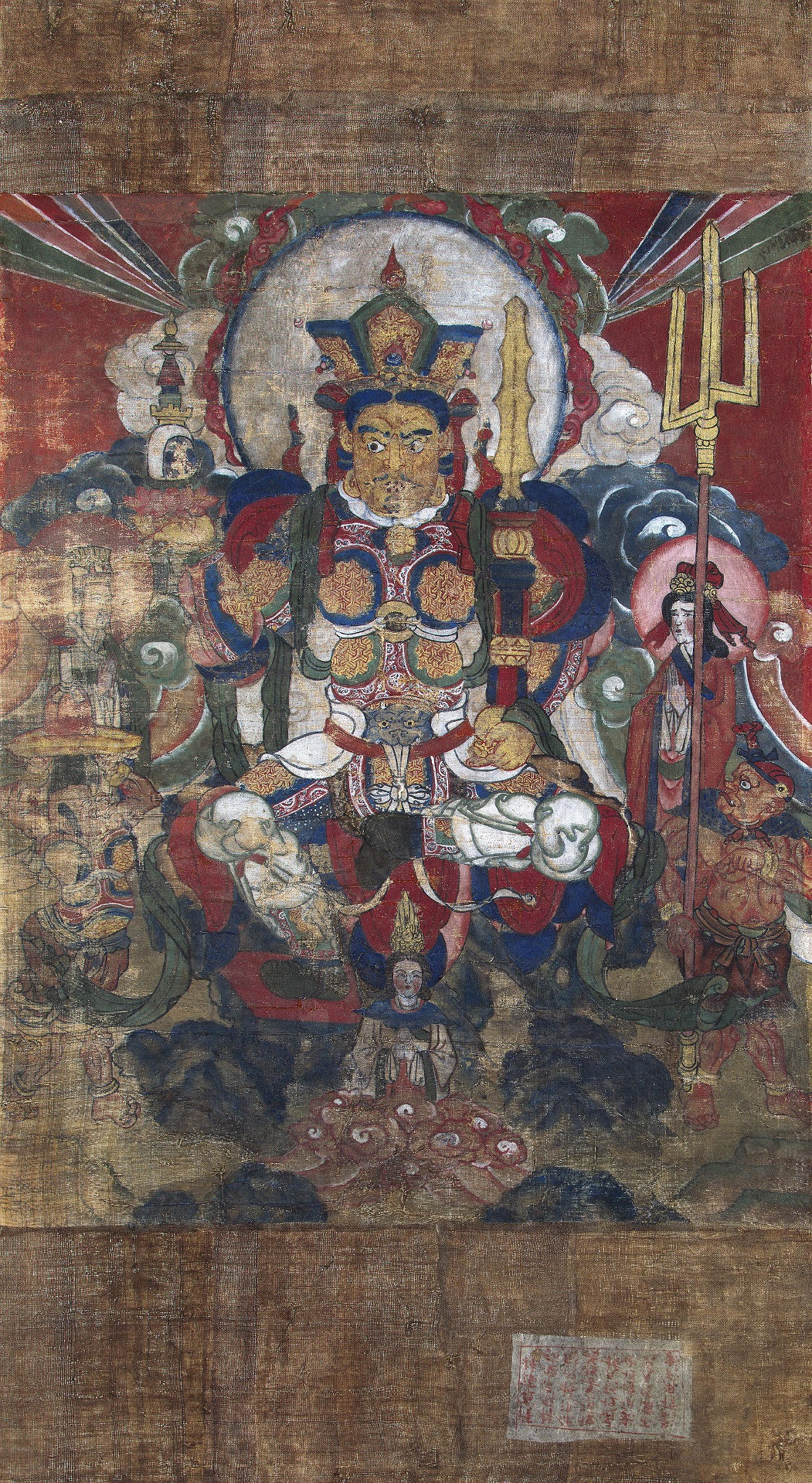
- "Golden Vaiśravaṇa", uncovered at Khara-Khoto, former city of the Tangut Empire; 13th century.
- Sanskrit: वैश्रवण; Vaiśravaṇa
- Pāli: वेस्सवण; Vessavaṇa
- Burmese: ကုဝေရ နတ်မင်း (Romanization: "Kuwera Nat Mang:"), ဝေဿဝဏ် နတ်မင်း
- Chinese: 多聞天王 (Pinyin: Duōwén Tiānwáng)
- Japanese: 毘沙門天 (romaji: Bishamonten)
- Korean: 다문천 (RR: Damuncheon)
- Mongolian: Баян Намсрай
- Sinhala: වෙසමුණි
- Thai: ท้าวเวสวัณ; Thao Wetsuwan
- Tibetan: ཡུལ་འཁོར་སྲུང; Wylie: rnam thos sras THL: Namthöse
- Vietnamese: Tỳ Sa Môn Thiên

Information
- Venerated by: Theravāda: (Ātānātiya Sutta); (Mahāsamāya Sutta)
- Attributes: Guardian of the North

Vaiśravaṇa (Sanskrit: वैश्रवण) or Vessavaṇa (Pali; Tibetan: རྣམ་ཐོས་སྲས་, Lhasa dialect: [Namtösé], traditional Chinese: 多聞天王; simplified Chinese: 多闻天王; pinyin: Duōwén Tiānwáng, Japanese: 毘沙門天, romanized: Bishamonten) is one of the Four Heavenly Kings, and is considered an important figure in Buddhism. He is the god of warfare and usually portrayed as a warrior-king. Vaiśravana is based on Kubera, the Hindu deity of wealth.

== Names ==
The name Vaiśravaṇa is a vṛddhi derivative (used, e.g., for patronymics) of the Sanskrit proper name Viśravaṇa from the root vi-śru "hear distinctly", (passive) "become famous". The name Vaiśravaṇa is derived from the Sanskrit viśravaṇa which means "son of Vishrava", a usual epithet of the Hindu god Kubera. Vaiśravaṇa is also known as Kubera and Jambhala in Sanskrit and Kuvera in Pāli.

Other names include:

- traditional Chinese: 多聞天; simplified Chinese: 多闻天; pinyin: Duōwén Tiān; Japanese: 多聞天 (Tamonten); Korean: 다문천 (Damuncheon); Vietnamese: Đa Văn Thiên, a calque of Sanskrit Vaiśravaṇa
- traditional Chinese: 毗沙門天; simplified Chinese: 毗沙门天; pinyin: Píshāméntiān; Japanese: 毘沙門天 (Bishamonten); Korean: 비사문천 (Bisamuncheon); Vietnamese: Tỳ Sa Môn Thiên. This was a loanword from Vaiśravaṇa into Middle Chinese with the addition of the word "heaven, god"
- Tibetan: རྣམ་ཐོས་སྲས, Wylie: rnam thos sras, THL Namthöse, "Prince All-Hearing", a calque of Sanskrit Vaiśravaṇa
- Mongolian: Баян Намсрай bajn namsrɛ is a loan from Tibetan thos sras, a short form of Tibetan rnam thos sras with the addition of an honorific
- Tagalog: Bisrabana is a loanword from Vaiśravaṇa.
- Thai: ท้าวกุเวร Thao Kuwen or ท้าวเวสวัณ Thao Wetsuwan is an honorific plus the modern pronunciation of Pali Vessavaṇa.

== Characteristics ==
The character of Vaiśravaṇa is founded upon the Hindu deity Kubera, but although the Buddhist and Hindu deities share some characteristics and epithets, each of them has different functions and associated myths. Although brought into East Asia as a Buddhist deity, Vaiśravaṇa has become a character in folk religion and has acquired an identity that is partially independent of the Buddhist tradition (cf. the similar treatment of Guanyin and Yama).

Vaiśravaṇa is the guardian of the northern direction, and his home is in the northern quadrant of the topmost tier of the lower half of Sumeru. He is the leader of all the yakṣas who dwell on the Sumeru's slopes. In the Indian tradition, very often he is identified with Kubera. It seems that Vaiśravaṇa has a non-Vedic non-Aryan origin. Originally he appears to be a spirit or a goblin lying concealed in the hollows and clefts of the earth. Gradually, he became comparatively a benevolent spirit. And he attained the status of the leadership of Guhyaka-s and Yakṣa-s, the lordship of treasures, and the guardianship of the Northern Direction.

He is often portrayed with a yellow face. He carries an umbrella or parasol (chatra) as a symbol of his sovereignty. He is also sometimes displayed with a mongoose, often shown ejecting jewels from its mouth. The mongoose is the enemy of the snake, a symbol of greed or hatred; the ejection of jewels represents generosity.

== In Pali Canon ==
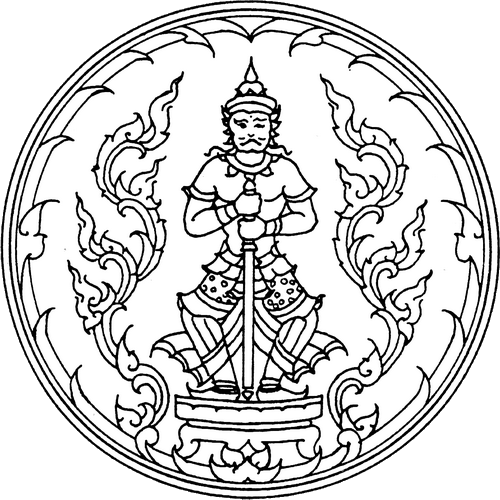
Vaiśravaṇa as the Seal of Udon Thani Province, Thailand

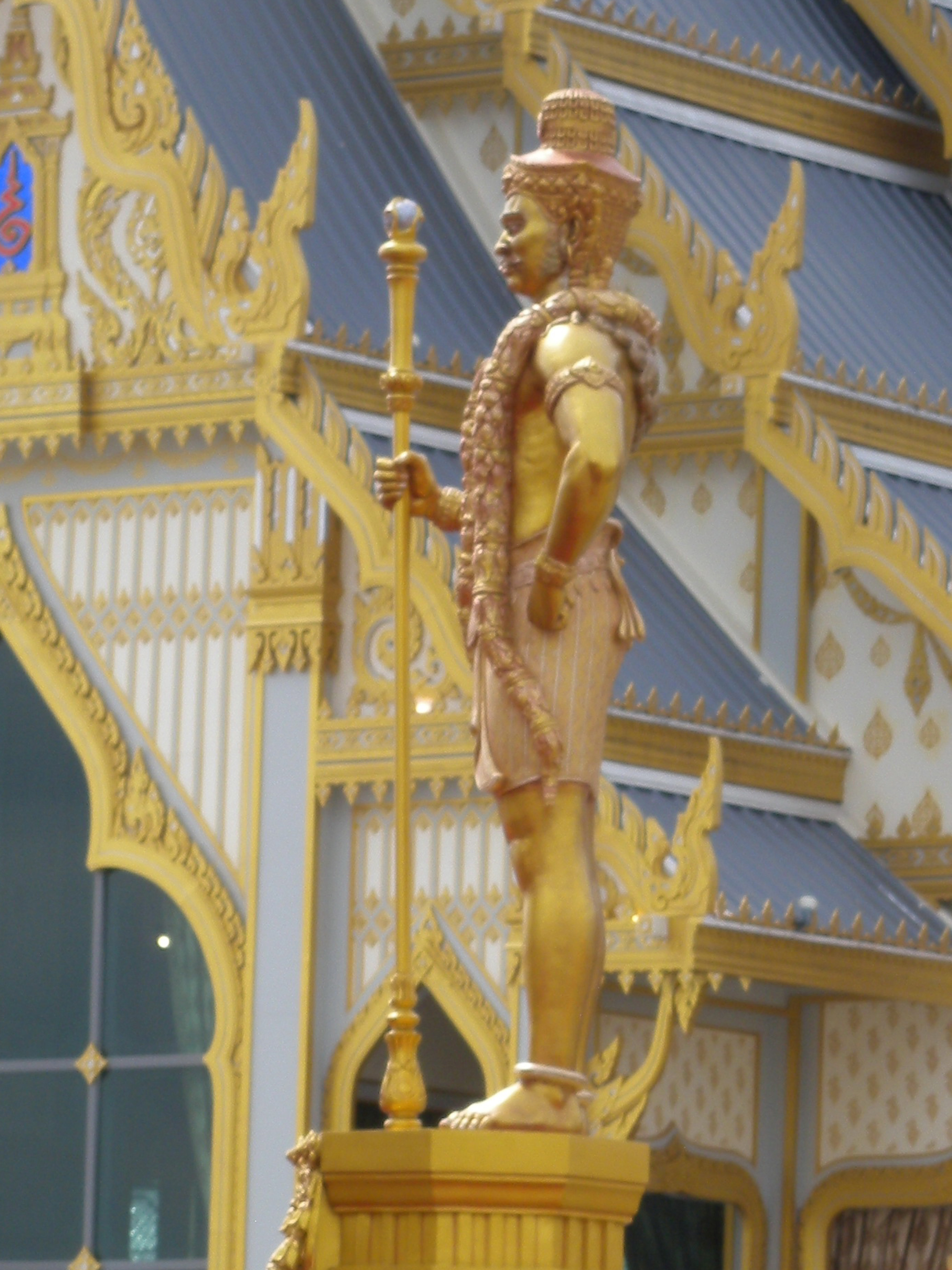
Statue of Vaiśravaṇa as the guardian at the royal crematorium of King Bhumibol Adulyadej of Thailand, 2017.

In the Pāli Canon of Theravāda Buddhism, Vaiśravaṇa is called Vessavaṇa. Vessavaṇa is one of the Cāturmahārājika deva or "Four Great Heavenly Kings", each of whom rules over a specific direction. Vessavaṇa's realm is the northern quadrant of the world, including the land of Uttarakuru. According to some suttas, he takes his name from a region there called Visāṇa; he also has a city there called Ālakamandā which is a byword for wealth. Vessavaṇa governs the yakshas – beings with a nature between 'fairy' and 'ogre'.

Vessavaṇa's wife is named Bhuñjatī, and he has five daughters, Latā, Sajjā, Pavarā, Acchimatī, and Sutā. He has a nephew called Puṇṇaka, a yakkha, husband of the nāga woman Irandatī. He has a chariot called Nārīvāhana. He is called gadāvudha (Sanskrit: gadāyudha) "armed with a club", but he only used it before he became a follower of the Buddha.

Vessavaṇa has the name "Kuvera" from a name he had from a past life as a rich Brahmin mill-owner from Sri Lanka, who gave all the produce of one of his seven mills to charity, and provided alms to the needy for 20,000 years. He was reborn in the Cātummahārājikā heaven as a result of this good karma.

As with all the Buddhist deities, Vessavaṇa is properly the name of an office (filled for life) rather than a permanent individual. Each Vessavaṇa is mortal, and when he dies, he will be replaced by a new Vessavaṇa. Like other beings of the Cātummahārājika world, his lifespan is 90,000 years (other sources say nine million years). Vessavaṇa has the authority to grant the yakkhas particular areas (e.g., a lake) to protect, and these are usually assigned at the beginning of a Vessavaṇa's reign.

When Gautama Buddha was born, Vessavaṇa became his follower, and eventually attained the stage of sotāpanna, one who has only seven more lives before enlightenment. He often brought the Buddha and his followers messages from the gods and other humans, and protected them. He presented to the Buddha the Āṭānāṭā verses, which Buddhists meditating in the forest could use to ward off the attacks of wild yakkhas or other supernatural beings who do not have faith in the Buddha. These verses are an early form of paritta chanting.

Bimbisāra, King of Magadha, after his death was reborn as a yakkha called Janavasabha in the retinue of Vessavaṇa.

In the early years of Buddhism, Vessavaṇa was worshipped at trees dedicated to him as shrines. Some people appealed to him to grant them children.

== In China ==
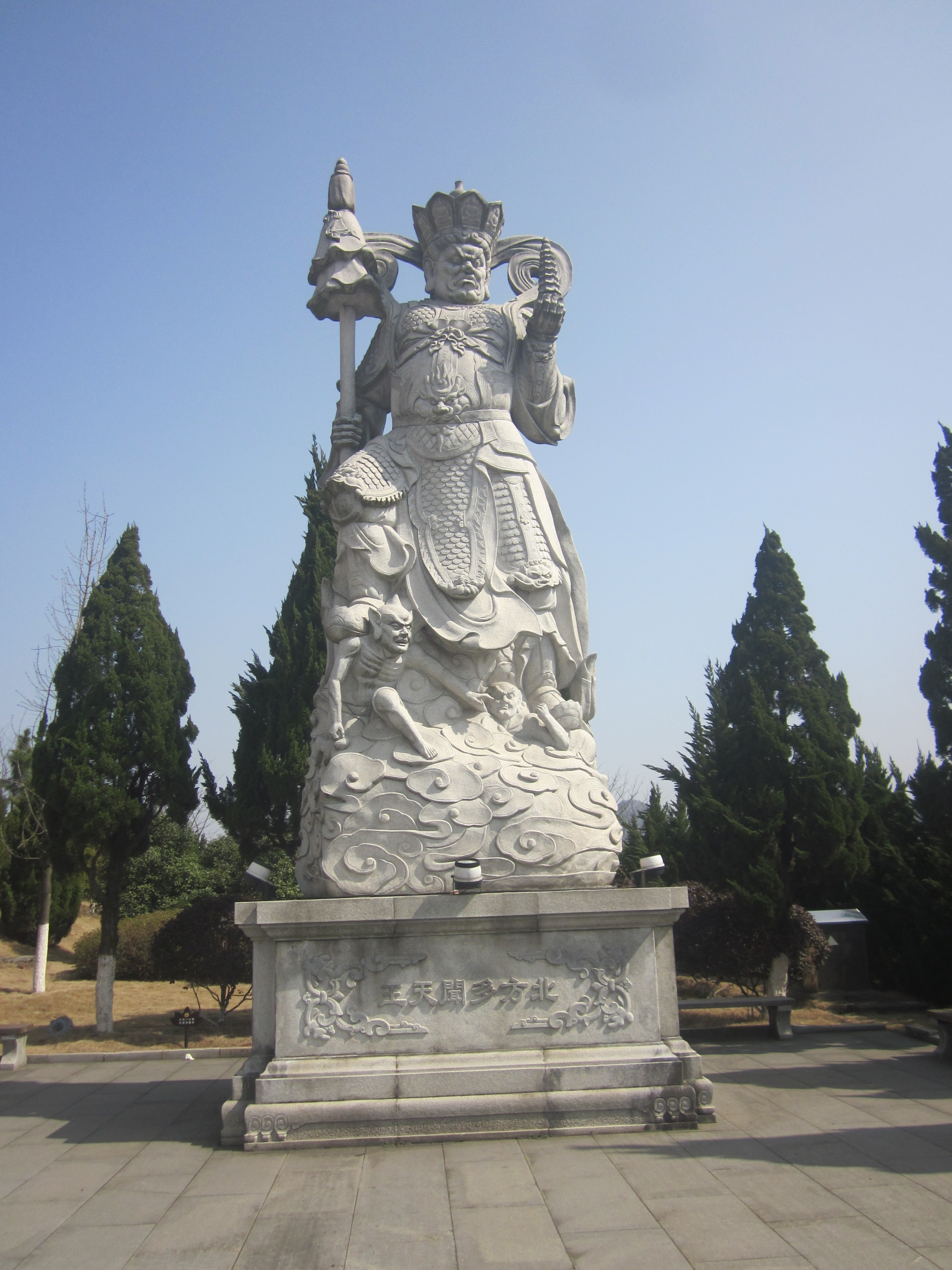
Statue of Duōwén Tiānwáng, in the Hall of Four Heavenly Kings in Miyin Temple in Weishan Township, Ningxiang, Hunan, China

In China, Vaiśravaṇa, also known as Píshāméntiān (毗沙門天), is one of the Four Heavenly Kings, and he is considered to be a warrior god and protector of the north. He is also regarded as one of the Twenty Devas (二十諸天 Èrshí Zhūtiān) or the Twenty-Four Devas (二十四諸天 Èrshísì zhūtiān), a group of Buddhist dharmapalas who manifest to protect the Dharma. In Chinese Buddhist iconography, he holds a pagoda in his right hand and a trident in his left hand. In Chinese temples, he is often enshrined within the Hall of the Heavenly Kings (天王殿) with the other three Heavenly Kings. His name Duōwén Tiānwáng (多聞天王 lit. "listening to many (teachings)") is a reference to the belief that he guards the place where the Buddha teaches. In Taoist belief, he is conflated with the god Li Jing, whose iconography incorporates many of Vaiśravaṇa's characteristics, such as carrying a pagoda.

== In Japan ==
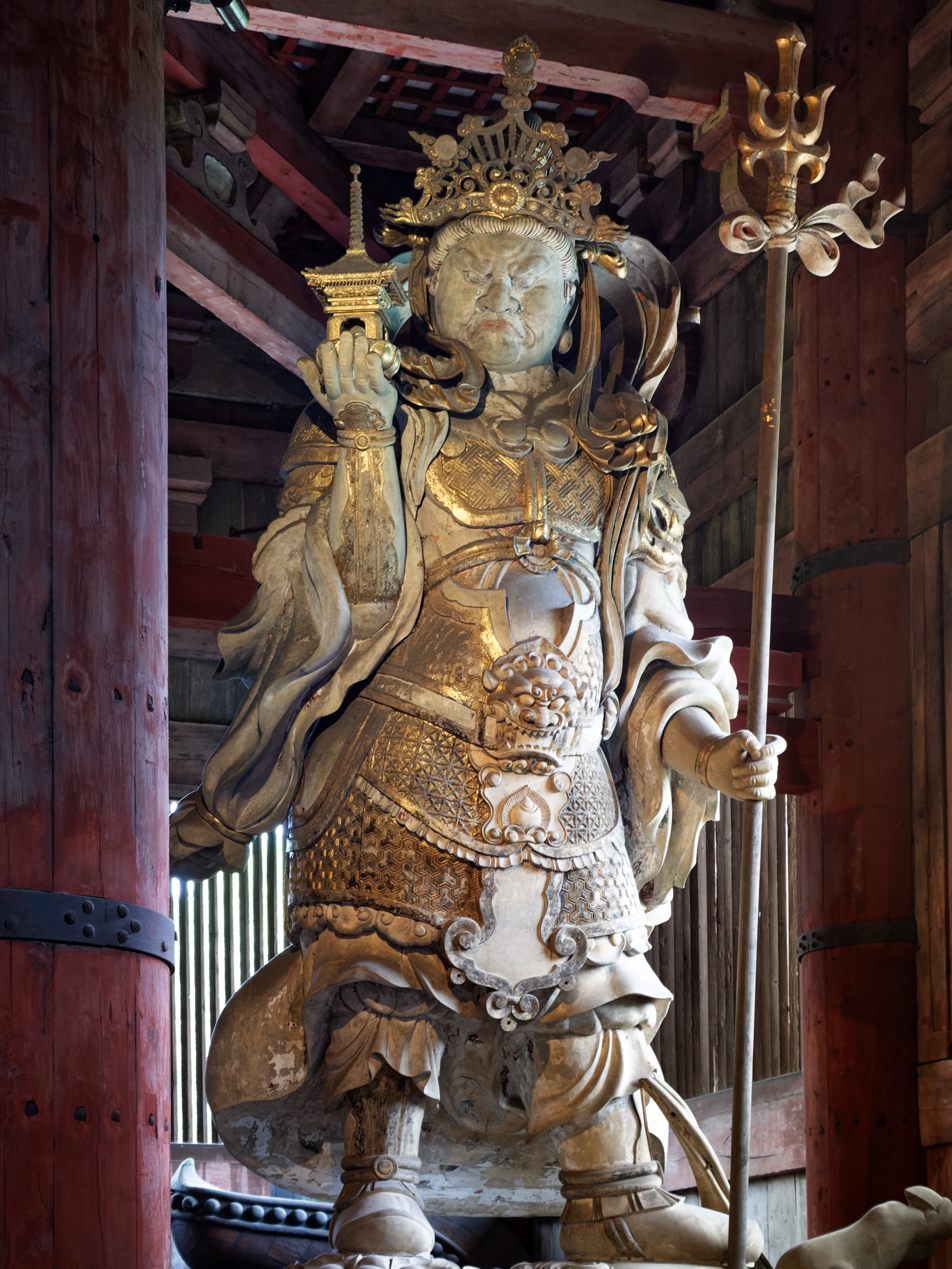
Tamonten statue at Tōdai-ji, Nara

In Japan, Bishamonten (毘沙門天), or just Bishamon (毘沙門) is thought of as an armor-clad god of war or warriors and a punisher of evildoers. Bishamon is portrayed holding a spear in one hand and a small pagoda in the other hand, the latter symbolizing the divine treasure house, whose contents he both guards and gives away. In Japanese folklore, he is one of the Seven Lucky Gods.

Bishamon is also called Tamonten (多聞天 lit. "listening to many teachings") because he is seen as the guardian of the places where the Buddha preaches. He is believed to live halfway down Mount Sumeru. He is also associated with Hachiman. Especially in the Shingon tradition that gives some place and worth to this hybrid character of Bishamon although most Mahayana temples have Bishamon and his counterpart as guardians at the entrance gate.

== In Tibet ==
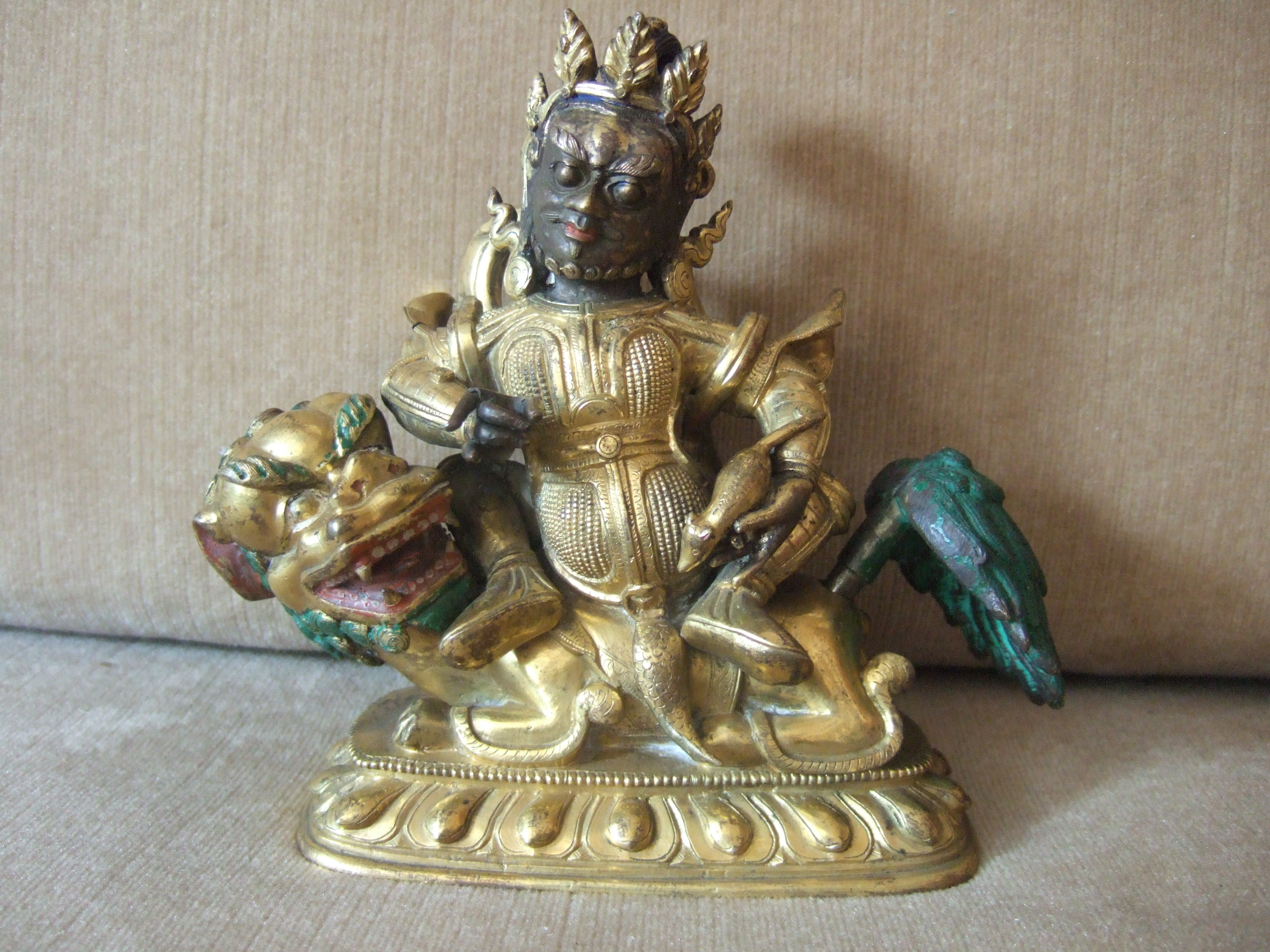
Partly gilded Tibetan bronze statue of Vaisravana (Jambhala) sitting on a snow lion and holding a mongoose in his left hand. 18th century

In Tibet, Vaiśravaṇa is considered a lokapāla or dharmapāla in the retinue of Ratnasambhava. He is also known as the King of the North. As guardian of the north, he is often depicted on temple murals outside the main door. He is also thought of as a god of wealth. As such, Vaiśravaṇa is sometimes portrayed carrying a citron, the fruit of the jambhara tree, a pun on another name of his, Jambhala. The fruit helps distinguish him iconically from depictions of Kuvera. He is sometimes represented as corpulent and covered with jewels. When shown seated, his right foot is generally pendant and supported by a lotus-flower on which is a conch shell. His mount is a snow lion. Tibetan Buddhists consider Jambhala's sentiment regarding wealth to be providing freedom by way of bestowing prosperity, so that one may focus on the path or spirituality rather than on the materiality and temporality of that wealth.

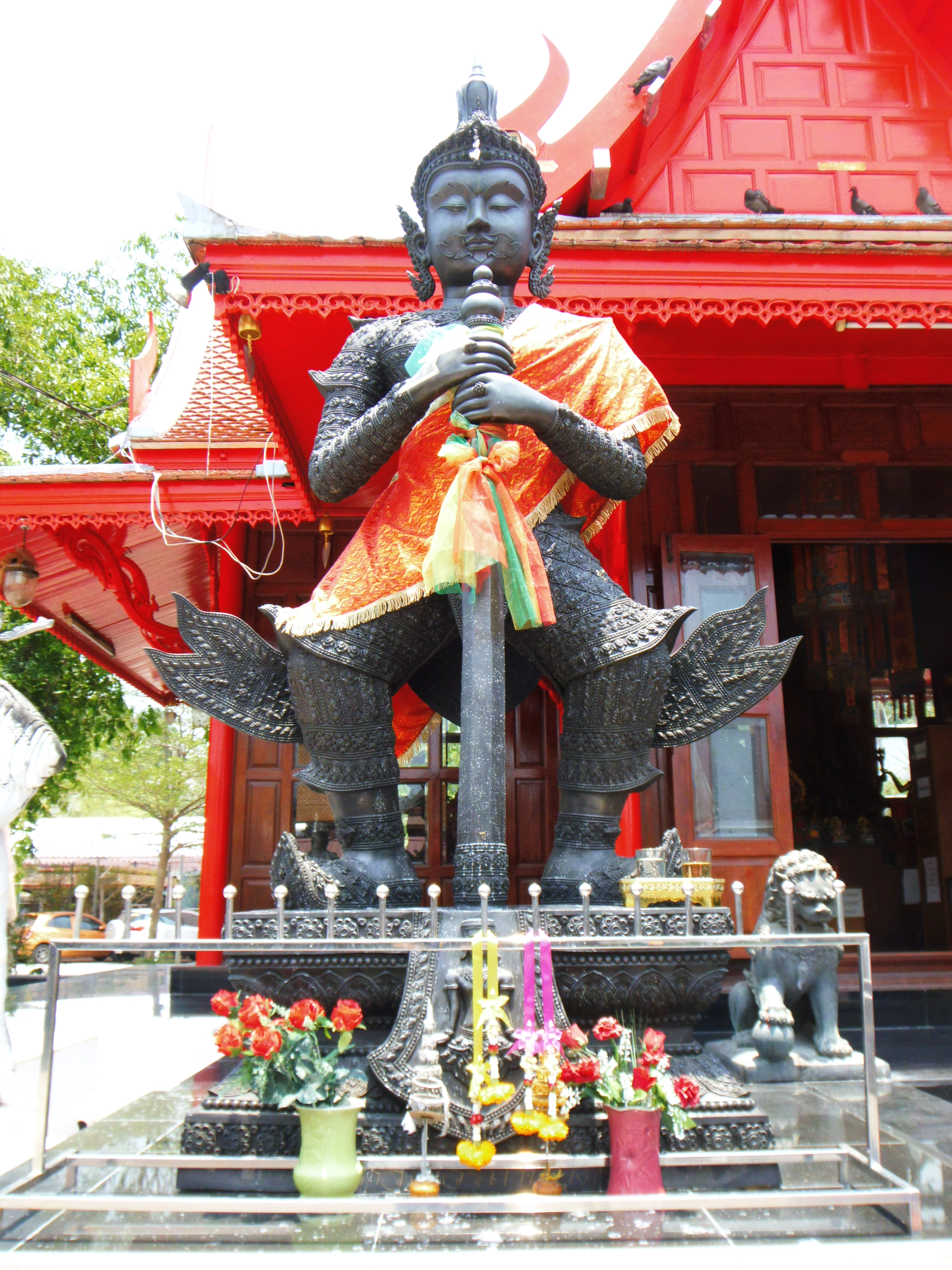
Statue of Vaiśravaṇa at Wat Chulamanee

== Thailand ==
In Thailand, he resolves the dispute that arose in the legend of Nang Ai and Phadaeng. At Wat Chulamanee temple in Samut Songkhram Province, there is a huge statue of him that is very popular in worship, until becoming a phenomenon in the early 2022.

In addition, Vaiśravaṇa also appears as the Seal of Udon Thani Province. According to the myth, Udon Thani is on the north direction, which is the resident of guardian of the north or Vaiśravaṇa.

== In popular culture ==
The 2011 manga Noragami, which revolves around Japanese mythology, depicts this deity's Japanese iteration Bishamonten as a lady possessing similar traits and equipped with modern weapons.

In the anime Record of Ragnarok, Bishamonten also made a depiction as a fighter of the Ragnarok, representing the Gods.

In the Touhou Project video game series, Shou Toramaru, a tiger yōkai, serves as a physical avatar of Bishamonten. She has the ability to gather treasures and create gemstones with her jeweled pagoda, reflecting Bishamonten's status as one of the Seven Lucky Gods.

In the 2021 manga Wind Breaker (manga), the character Tōma Hiragi represents Bishamonten, which is pictured as someone dressed in black leather and chains, standing on a pile of skulls and holding a long metal pipe in one hand and an MP3 player in the other.

== See also ==
- Buddhism and violence
- Four Heavenly Kings
- Hachiman—Shinto God of War
- Iron Man, Tibetan sculpture of Vaiśravaṇa carved from a meteorite
- Li Jing
- Pañcika, commander-in-chief, or general, of Vaiśravaṇa's Yakṣa army
- Seven Lucky Gods
- Uesugi Kenshin
- Vasudhara
