= Guishan Guanyin =

Statue of Bodhisattva Guanyin in Hunan province, China

- 龟山观音
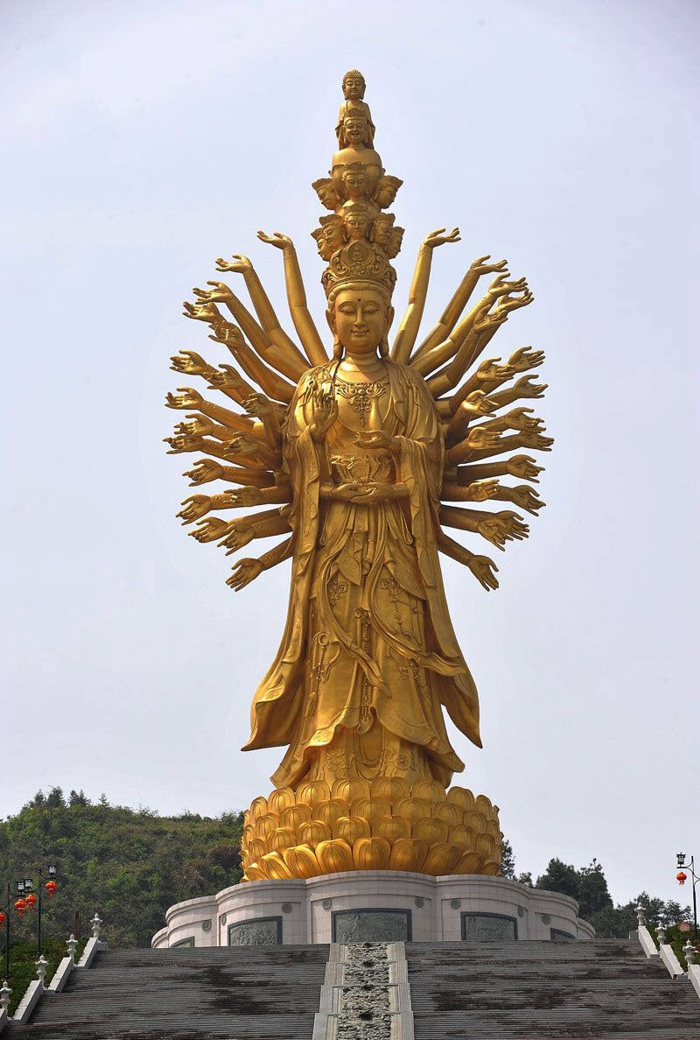
- Interactive map of Guishan Guanyin
- Location: Weishan Township, Ningxiang, Hunan, China
- Coordinates: 28°11′5.99″N 111°57′48.05″E
- Type: statue
- Material: gilded bronze
- Height: 99 metres (325 ft)
- Completion date: 2009

Chinese name
- Simplified Chinese: 沩山千手千眼观音圣像
- Traditional Chinese: 溈山千手千眼觀音聖像
Transcriptions
Standard Mandarin
- Hanyu Pinyin: Guīshān qiānshǒu qiānyǎn Guānyīn shèngxiàng

The Guishan Guanyin of the Thousand Hands and Eyes is located in Ningxiang, Hunan province, and is the fourth-tallest statue in China, and the sixth-tallest in the world, found at Miyin Temple, a Chan Buddhist temple. It is a gilded bronze monument depicting a manifestation of the Bodhisattva Guanyin known as Shiyimian Qianshou Guanyin (Traditional Chinese: 十一面千手觀音, Simplified Chinese: 十一面千手观音), meaning the "Eleven-headed Thousand-armed Guanyin", which stands at 99 m (325 ft) tall. The Ningshan County Government, with the help of local business and religious organizations, invested 260 million yuan to complete its construction in 2009.

== See also ==
- Miyin Temple
- List of tallest statues
