= Cambricon Technologies =

Chinese artificial intelligence chip manufacturer

Cambricon Technologies Corporation Limited
- Native name: 中科寒武纪科技股份有限公司
- Type: Public; State-owned enterprise
- Traded as: SSE: 688256; CSI A100
- Industry: GPUs
- Founded: 15 March 2016; 10 years ago
- Founders: Chen Yunji; Chen Tianshi; Liu Shaoli; Wang Zai
- Headquarters: Beijing, China
- Key people: Chen Tianshi (Chairman & CEO)
- Revenue: ▲CN¥1.18 billion (2024)
- Net income: ▲CN¥−456.93 million (2024)
- Total assets: ▲CN¥6.72 billion (2024)
- Total equity: ▼CN¥5.43 billion (2024)
- Number of employees: 980 (2024)
- Website: www.cambricon.com

Cambricon Technologies (Cambricon; Chinese: 寒武纪科技; pinyin: Hánwǔjì Kējì) is a partially state-owned publicly listed Chinese technology company headquartered in Beijing.

The company builds core processor chips and general-purpose graphics processing units (GPGPUs) for use in the field of artificial intelligence (AI). It has been compared to Nvidia due to their similar focus.

== History ==
Brothers Chen Yunji and Chen Tianshi entered the University of Science and Technology of China at an early age and received their doctorate degrees in computer science by the time they were 24. They then worked for the Chinese Academy of Sciences (CAS) with a focus on computing technology. The two were part of the Cambricon project which is named after the Cambrian explosion. The project formed in 2008 aimed to develop a brain-inspired processor chip specialized for deep learning. CAS set aside 10 million yuan to fund the project.

In March 2016, the Cambricon project was spun out as a business. The brothers co-founded the company Cambricon which was set up to bring chips from the Cambricon project to the commercial market. Yunji returned to academia shortly after the company's founding.

In June 2018, Cambricon was valued at US$2.5 billion making it one of China's most valuable AI startups. Early investors included Alibaba Group, Lenovo and iFlytek. By then it had produced AI chips to power smartphones and servers for large companies such as Huawei although the contract was terminated that year when Huawei decided to use its own AI chips from its subsidiary, HiSilicon which greatly affected Cambricon's revenue.

On 20 July 2020, Cambricon held its initial public offering (IPO) becoming a listed company on the Shanghai Stock Exchange STAR Market. There were concerns about Cambricon's prospects due to increasing competition in the field of AI chips as well as US sanctions. Despite this, the company had a strong debut with its share price rising 230% above its listing price, valuing the company at US$12 billion. Overall, the IPO raised $369 million.

On 15 December 2022, Cambricon was added to the US Bureau of Industry and Security Entity List.

In July 2023, Cambricon laid off half of its workers at its autonomous car chip unit SingGo due to cost-cutting measures.

In September 2023, it was reported that early investors including SDIC Venture Capital Management, China Merchants Bank and Alibaba Group had sold all their shares in Cambricon. At this point Cambricon's share price was only half of its IPO price as the company struggled to turn profit. Cambricon attributed the loss to increased investment in research and development to upgrade its products so they can remain competitive.

In February 2024, Cambricon reported an annual net loss for 2023, making it the seventh consecutive year of losses for the company although its losses were less than 2022. Due to US sanctions, the company struggled with access to advanced manufacturing processes making its products less competitive. The chips having inferior performance made it difficult to achieve widespread adoption. Cambricon had to heavily rely on government-affiliated clients for its revenue which was stable but not sufficient for sustained significant revenue growth.

In September 2024, Cambricon shares soared hitting the 20% daily limit after it was reported that the Chinese government was stepping up pressure on domestic companies to ditch Nvidia processors for local alternatives. During 2024, Cambricon shares rose 383% making it China's top stock in 2024.

In January 2025, it was reported that Cambricon achieved its first-ever quarterly profit in late 2024. In February 2026, Cambricon announced it would pay its maiden dividends after its first profitable year.

== See also ==
- Jingjia Micro
- Semiconductor industry in China
