= Chen Tianshi =

Chinese entrepreneur (born 1985)

- Born: June 1985 (age 41); Nanchang, Jiangxi, China
- Education: University of Science and Technology of China
- Title: Co-Founder of Cambricon Technologies

Chen Tianshi (born June 1985) is a Chinese AI researcher and businessman. He is the CEO and co-founder of the artificial intelligence chip manufacturer Cambricon Technologies. In February 2026, Bloomberg estimated his net worth at US$21.5 billion.

== Biography ==
Chen Tianshi comes from Jiangxi Province. His father is an electrical engineer and his mother is a history teacher. His talent was noticed early on, and as a teenager he and his brother Chen Yunji were accepted into a special program for gifted students at the University of Science and Technology of China. He earned a bachelor's degree in mathematics in 2005 and his PhD in computer science in 2010. His doctoral thesis received several awards. After completing his studies, he worked as a researcher for the Chinese Academy of Sciences and published more than 50 journal articles in renowned journals for computer science and artificial intelligence.

In 2016, he was one of the co-founders of the semiconductor company Cambricon Technologies, which originated from a research project at the Chinese Academy of Sciences. In 2017, Cambricon became a unicorn after investments from major Chinese technology companies such as Alibaba. The company went public in 2020. By 2024, Cambricon's share price had risen by 500%, benefiting from the Chinese government's increased efforts to achieve technological independence in the semiconductor sector. This surge multiplied Chen's fortune, making him one of the richest people in China due to his stake in Cambricon.
