= Jingjia Micro =

Chinese electronics company

Changsha Jingjia Microelectronics Co., Ltd
- Trade name: Jingjia Micro
- Native name: 长沙景嘉微电子股份有限公司
- Company type: Public
- Traded as: SZSE: 300474
- Industry: Electronics; Semiconductors
- Founded: 5 April 2006; 20 years ago
- Founders: Zeng Wanhui; Hu Yahua; Rao Xianhong
- Headquarters: Changsha, Hunan, China
- Key people: Zeng Wanhui (Chairman & CEO)
- Revenue: ▼CN¥713.25 million (2023)
- Net income: ▼CN¥59.68 million (2023)
- Total assets: ▲CN¥4.19 billion (2023)
- Total equity: ▲CN¥3.41 billion (2023)
- Number of employees: 1,140 (2023)
- Website: www.jingjiamicro.com

Jingjia Microelectronics (Jingjia; Chinese: 景嘉微; pinyin: Jǐngjiāwēi) is a publicly listed Chinese electronics company. It is China's largest graphics processing unit (GPU) producer and the only one with independently developed technology and commercial production on a large scale.

== Background ==
In 2006, Zeng Wanhui left his job at a government entity in Beijing to return to Changsha with his wife Yu Lili. Zeng joined his old National University of Defense Technology classmates Hu Yahua and Rao Xianhong to set up Jingjia.

In the early stages of development, it was agreed that Zeng would handle market development while Hu would handle software development and Rao would handle hardware development. Zeng would not receive a salary while the other two would receive a salary of 3,000 yuan per month.

Not long after the company was founded it received a commission from a research institute to develop GPU related software. The team realized that GPUs had large potential so the company focused on investing in developing them.

Jingjia used its early support from the Chinese government to develop several generations of GPUs for deployment in radars and satellites related to the military. It used its acquired knowledge to enter the civilian market for GPUs.

On 31 March 2016, Jingjia held its initial public offering becoming a listed company on the Shenzhen Stock Exchange. The China Integrated Circuit Industry Investment Fund would later acquired a stake of the company.

In December 2021, the US Department of Commerce's Bureau of Industry and Security added Jingjia to the Entity List. Jingjia said that it would have no material impact on its operations. Three months prior to the blacklist addition, Jingjia was flagged as a company connected with the Chinese military-industrial complex by the US Treasury Department.

In June 2023, Jingjia stated would raise 4.2 billion yuan in a private placement for GPU research and development. In July 2023, it was announced that Jingjia and the Wuxi High-Tech District would launch a GPU project that would generate 5 billion yuan worth of output per year.

In March 2024, Jingjia announced that it successfully developed a high-performance intelligent computing module and device that can be applied to artificial intelligence computing. As a result, shares surged up 12.8% on that day.

== Product history ==
In 2014, Jingjia taped out its first GPU, the JM5400-Series. This broke the monopoly of foreign GPUs in key sectors of China.

In 2019, Jingjia launched the M7200-Series in the civilian market which replaced low-end GPUs.

In 2021, Jingjia taped out the JM9-Series which were said to deliver a performance similar to that of the Nvidia GTX 1080. Although it offered the performance of Nvidia's 2016 GPUs it was expected that Jingjia would sell a lot of them to traditional customers that supply PCs to various government controlled organizations.

== See also ==
- Cambricon Technologies
- Semiconductor industry in China
