= Tian Han Grand Theatre =

Theatre in Changsha, Hunan, China

Coordinates: 28°10′45″N 112°59′25″E

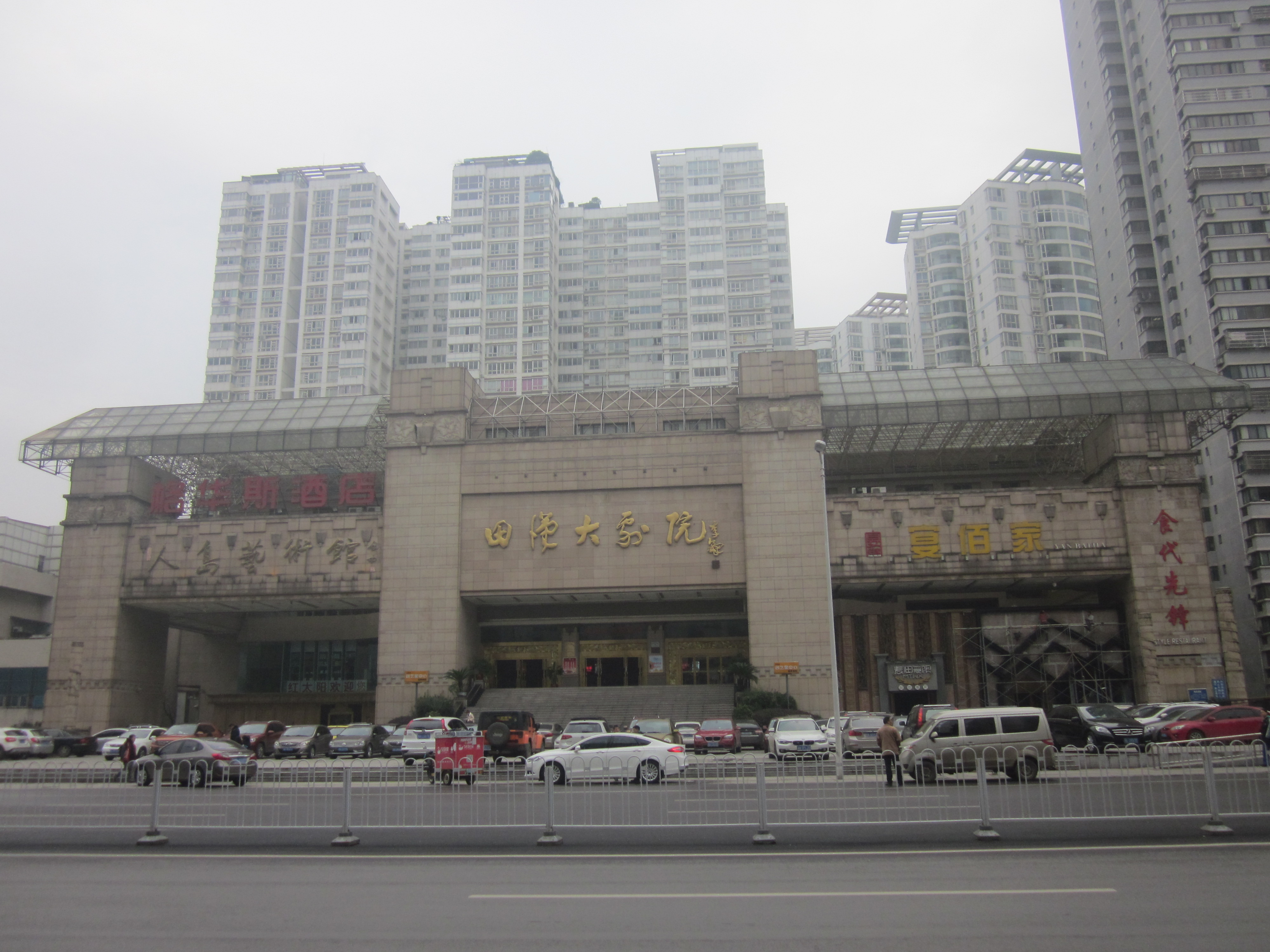
Tian Han Grand Theatre.

The Tian Han Grand Theatre (simplified Chinese: 田汉大剧院; traditional Chinese: 田漢大劇院; pinyin: Tiánhàn Dàjùyuàn) is a theatre on West Laodong Road in Tianxin District of Changsha, Hunan, China. The theater, named after the pioneering Chinese playwright Tian Han, comprises the Great Theater, Concert Hall, Tian Han Memorial Hall, Art Gallery and the Masses Culture Plaza.
