= Dawei Mountain National Forest Park =

Park in Hunan, China

- 大围山国家森林公园
- Location within Hunan
- Interactive map of Dawei Mountain National Forest Park
- Type: Public park, state park
- Location: Daweishan, Liuyang of Changsha, Hunan, China
- Coordinates: 28°25′N 114°07′E
- Area: 46.67-square-kilometre (18.02 sq mi)
- Elevation: 1,607.9-metre (5,275 ft)
- Created: 1992
- Status: Open all year

Chinese name
- Simplified Chinese: 大围山国家森林公园
- Traditional Chinese: 大圍山國家森林公園
Transcriptions
Standard Mandarin
- Hanyu Pinyin: Dàwéishān Guójiā Sēnlín Gōngyuán

Dawei Mountain National Forest Park (Chinese: 大围山国家森林公园) is a National Forest Park, AAAA-level tourist attraction, and National Geological Park located in Liuyang of Changsha, Hunan, at the Hunan-Jiangxi border. It covers a total area of approximately 46.67-square-kilometre (18.02 sq mi) and is renowned for its rich biodiversity, glacial geological site, and cultural history.

== History ==
The name "Dawei" derives from its terrain of "rolling hills encircling three counties", namely Liuyang, Tonggu, and Pingjiang.

During the rulingof Wanli Emperor (1573–1620) of the Ming dynasty (1368–1644), a fort called Dawei Fort was built on the mountain.

During the Republic of China, in the Second Revolutionary Civil War (1927–1937), it served as a critical Red Army base and formed part of the Hunan-Hubei-Jiangxi Revolutionary Base.

After founding of the People's Republic of China, it was designated a nature reserve in 1984 and officially became a National Forest Park in 1992. In 2016, it gained National Geological Park status due to its Quaternary glacial site.

== Geography ==
=== Geology ===
Dawei Mountain National Forest Park belongs to the tectonic denudation and erosion granite mid-low mountain landform, primarily featuring middle mountain terrain. It bears the marks of Quaternary glacial deposits and erosion, which formed 48 lakes. The highest peak, Seven Star Peak, has an elevation of 1,607.9-metre (5,275 ft), making it the highest peak in eastern Hunan.

=== Climate ===
Dawei Mountain National Forest Park has a mid-subtropical monsoon humid climate with an annual average temperature of 11 to 16 °C (52 to 61 °F). The area receives abundant rainfall, with an annual precipitation of 1,800-to-2,000-millimetre (71 to 79 in), which can reach 2,200-millimetre (87 in) at the mountaintop.

=== Flora and fauna ===
The forest coverage reaches 99.5%, preserving primary and secondary forests. Over 3,000 plant species across 23 formations, including 17 state-protected species (e.g., rare trees), in the park. Over 60 wildlife species (e.g., mammals, birds) and 14 state-protected animals inhabit the park. The park is also a habitat for over 1,200 butterfly species, earning the nickname "Natural Animal and Plant Museum".

== Main Attractions ==
- Seven Star Peak (七星岭; 七星嶺; Qīxīng Lǐng): the highest peak in eastern Hunan at 1,607.9 meters; ideal for sunrises, sea of clouds, and stargazing; features glacial landforms like horn peaks and knife ridges.
- Limu Bridge Scenic Area (栗木桥景区; 栗木橋景區; Lìmù Qiáo Jǐngqū): a valley with streams, bizarre rocks, and waterfalls (e.g., Fenglin Waterfall); known as the "essence of Dawei Mountain" for its pristine waterways.
- Maweicao Waterfall Group (马尾漕瀑布群; 馬尾漕瀑布群; Mǎwěicáo Pùbù Qún): a series of 48 interconnected waterfalls with high negative oxygen ion concentrations.
- Red Lotus Temple (红莲寺; 紅蓮寺; Hónglián Sì): a 1,600-year-old temple from the Liang Dynasty, housing jade Buddhas and ancient relics.
- Yuquan Lake (玉泉湖; Yùquán Hú) and Daoquan Lake (祷泉湖; Dǎoquán Hú): glacial ice pits transformed into wetlands; Daoquan Lake is recognized as the source of the Liuyang River.
- Quaternary Glacial Relics: distributed across Limu Bridge, Seven Star Peak, and Yuquan Lake, showcasing erratics, U-shaped valleys, and ice pits.
