= Miyin Temple =

Buddhist temple in Ningxiang, China

- 密印寺
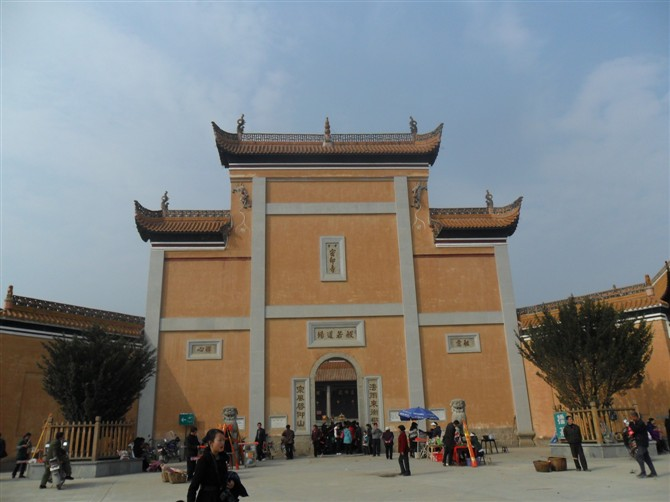
- Shanmen.

- Location within Hunan Location within China

Religion
- Affiliation: Buddhism
- Sect: Chan - Weiyang school

Location
- Location: Weishan Township, Ningxiang, Hunan
- Country: China
- Coordinates: 28°10′36″N 111°58′16″E

Architecture
- Founder: Weishan Lingyou
- Completed: 807

Miyin Temple (Chinese: 密印寺; pinyin: Mìyìn Sì) is a Buddhist temple located in Weishan Township, Ningxiang, Hunan, China. The temple is built within grounds of some 9,000 square metres (97,000 sq ft). The Chinese Buddhist monk Weishan Lingyou of the Tang dynasty (618–907) founded Miyin Temple on Mount Wei and started the Weiyang school of Buddhism making Mount Wei an important religious sacred site in China's feudalist era.

== History ==
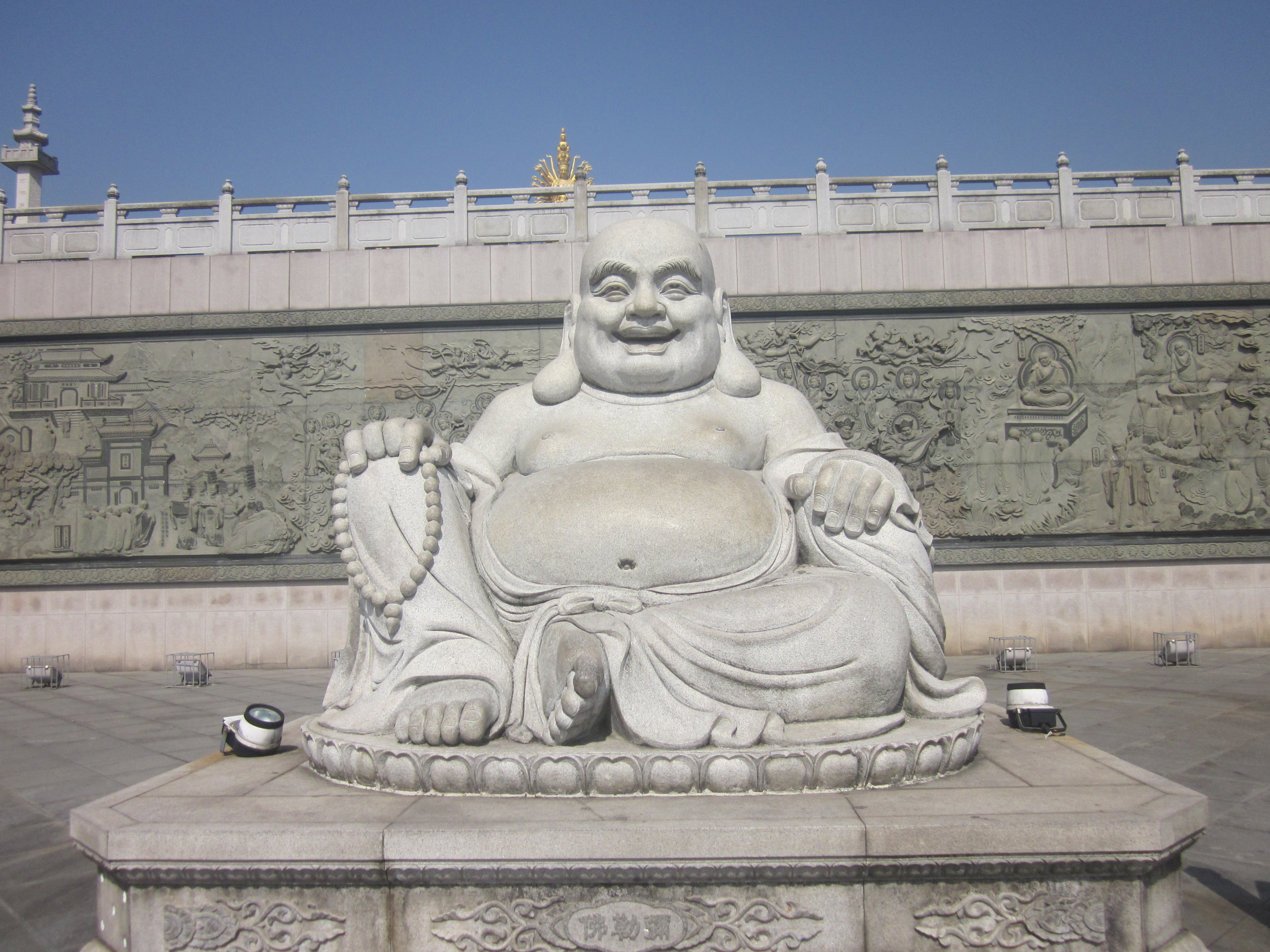
Sitting Statue of Maitreya in Miyin Temple.

=== Tang dynasty ===
In 813, in the eighth year of the age of Yuanhe of Emperor Xianzong, the traveler who named Liu Qian (刘潜) came to Ningxiang, Hunan Province. He saw the Wei Mountain's steep cliffs, lofty peaks, roaring waterfalls, gurgling springs, towering trees and fragrant flowers, and Wei Mountain has seven hills like the Big Dipper. After the tour, Liu Qian came to Baizhang Mountain (百丈山) in Jiangxi and told his friend Baizhang Huaihai about the natural landscape he had seen. He told Huaihai that there would be a good place to build temples. Huaihai followed Liuqian's advice, he commanded his disciple Weishan Lingyou to go there, build temples and advertise Folk Buddhism. On August 15 in the Chinese lunar calendar, Lingyou came to Wei Mountain. He built a hut to live in. In 807, in the second year of the age of Yuanhe of Emperor Xianzong, Da'an (大安禅师) and Lingyou built Yingchan Temple (应禅寺). They then renamed it Santa Temple (三塔寺).

In 845, after the Great Anti-Buddhist Persecution, Lingyou disbanded the monastery, and lived a self-cultivation for food life. At that time, the prime minister Pei Xiu had retreated and worked in Hunan for Jingzhou Provincial Governor. He was Lingyou's friend. He sent Lingyou a copy of the Chinese Buddhist canon.

In 849, Emperor Xuanzong renamed the temple Miyin Temple (密印禅寺). At that time, the prime minister Pei Xiu built Miyin Temple, and his second son Pei Wende (裴文德) replaced the crown prince as a monk. Lingyou gave him a Buddhist name Fahai (法海). He was a monk in the most famous Chinese tale the Legend of the White Snake.

When Lingyou came to Yang Mountain, Yichun, Jiangxi, he found a new form of Buddhism: Guiyang school.

=== Song dynasty ===
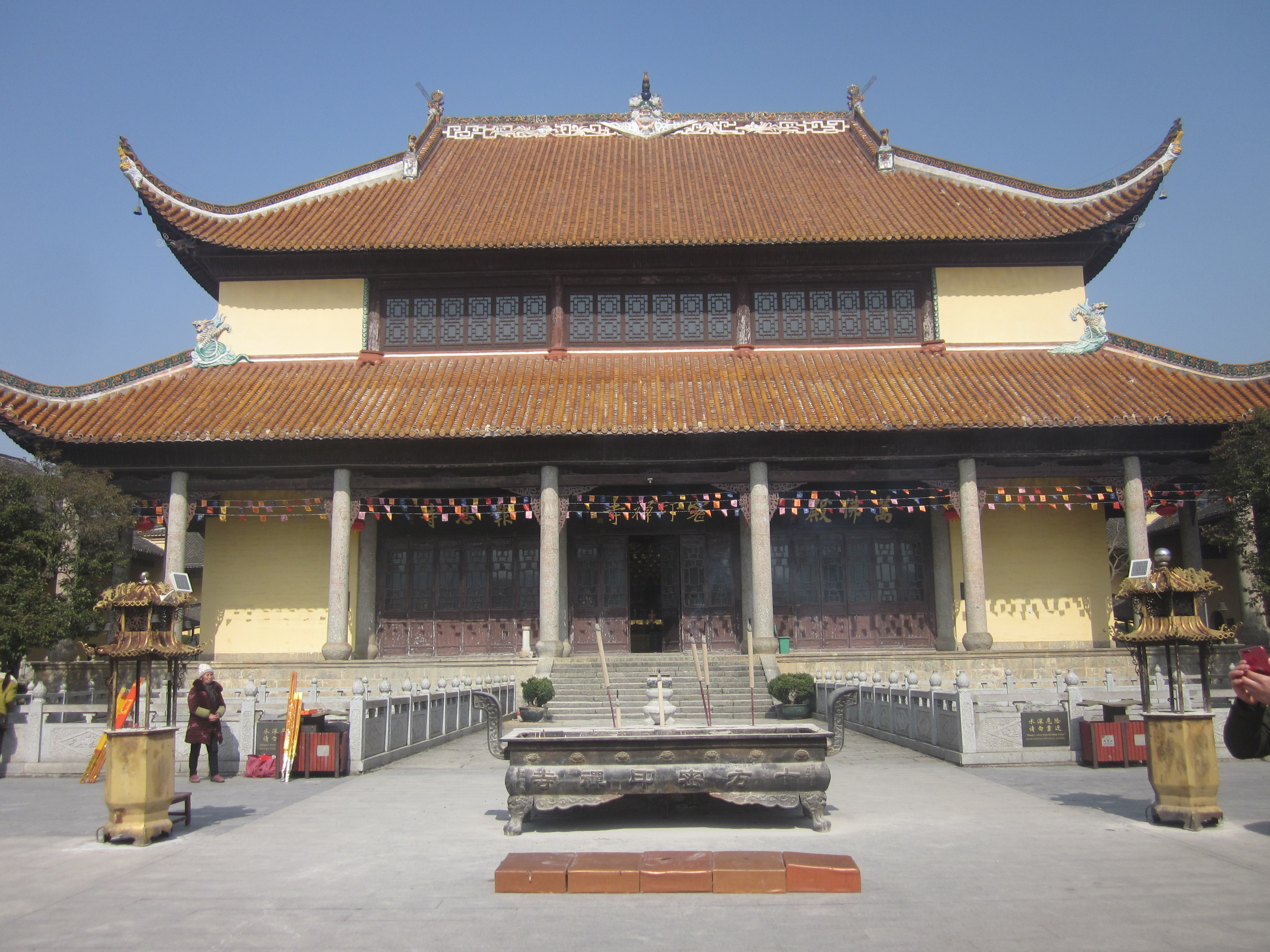
The Multi-Buddha Hall (or Wanfo Hall) at Miyin Temple.

In 1104, in the third year of the age of Chongning of Emperor Huizong, Miyin Temple was destroyed by fire. Monk Kongyin (空印禅师) rebuilt it.

=== Ming dynasty ===
In 1370, in the third year of the age of Hongwu of Hongwu Emperor, Miyin Temple was destroyed by fire, Chedang (彻当禅师) rebuilt the Multi-Buddha Hall (万佛殿).

In 1619, in the forty-seventh year of the age of Wanli of Wanli Emperor, Miyin Temple was destroyed by fire.

=== Qing dynasty ===
In 1655, in the twelfth year of the age of Shunzhi of Shunzhi Emperor, Huishan Chaohai (慧山超海) rebuilt Miyin Temple and changed the religious format to the Rinzai school.

=== Republic of China ===
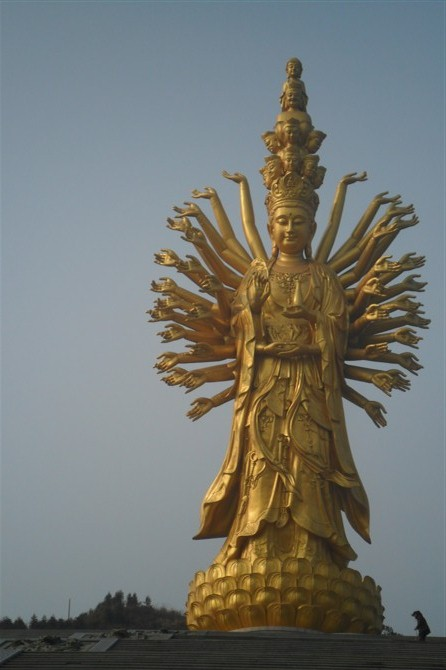
Thousands Hands Guanyin.

In 1918, Miyin Temple was destroyed by fire, the arsonist was Zhang Sanyuan (张三元).

In 1922, monk Yongguang (永光禅师) recovered the Guiyang school of Buddhism at this temple. He invited some Eminent monks to advertise Folk Buddhism.

In 1933, a monk named Bao (僧宝) raised donations and rebuilt Miyin Temple.

=== People's Republic of China ===
In 1966, during the Cultural Revolution, Miyin Temple was knocked down by the Red Guards.

In 1972, Miyin Temple was listed as a provincial culture and relics site.

In September 2005, Hunan Buddhist Association, the People's Government of Ningxiang and Miyin Temple hosted "The International Buddhist Culture Festival".
