= Weishan Township, Ningxiang =

Weishan Township 沩山乡
- Township
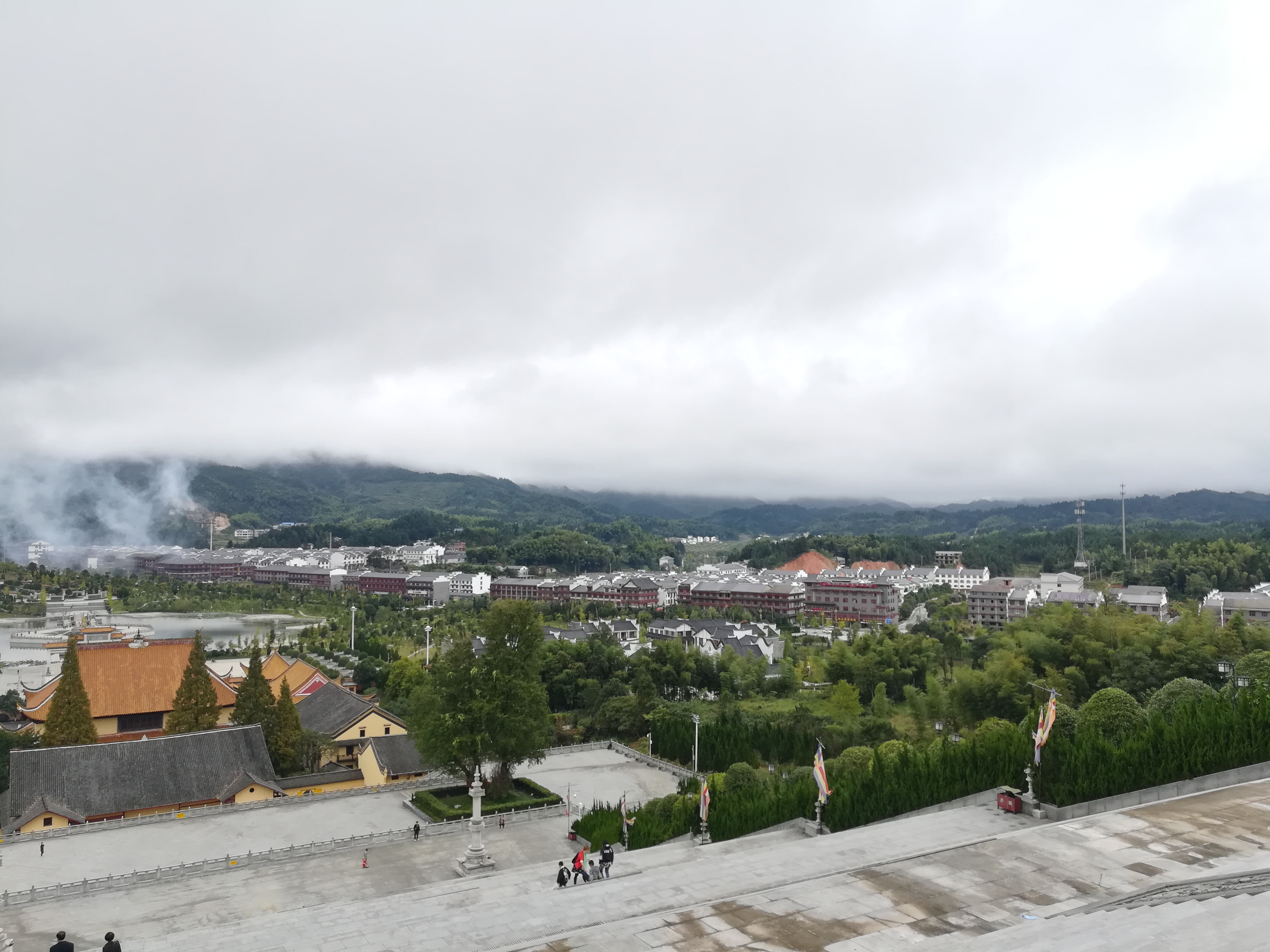
- A commanding view of Miyin Temple and Weishan Township in October 2017.

- Location in Hunan
- Coordinates: 28°10′32″N 111°58′01″E
- Country: People's Republic of China
- Province: Hunan
- Prefecture-level city: Changsha
- County-level city: Ningxiang

Area
  - Total: 42.8 km^{2} (16.5 sq mi)

Population
  - Total: 14,000
  - Density: 330/km^{2} (850/sq mi)
- Time zone: UTC+08:00 (China Standard)
- Postal code: 410627
- Area code: 0731
- Website: www.nxcity.gov.cn/wsx/index.html

Chinese name
- Traditional Chinese: 溈山鄉
- Simplified Chinese: 沩山乡
Transcriptions
Standard Mandarin
- Hanyu Pinyin: Wéishān Xiāng

Weishan Township (Chinese: 沩山乡) is a rural township in Ningxiang City, Hunan Province, China. It's surrounded by Dafu Town and Songmutang Town on the northwest, Huangcai Town on the northeast, and Xiangzikou Town on the south. As of the 2000 census it had a population of 14,532 and an area of 42.8 square kilometres (16.5 sq mi).

== Administrative divisions ==
The township is divided into one community and four villages:

- Wishan Community (沩山社区)
- Tongqing (同庆村)
- Zuta (祖塔村)
- Weifeng (沩峰村)
- Weishuiyuan (沩水源村).

== Geography ==
The Xiaolongtan Reservoir (小龙潭水库) is located in the township and discharges into the Wei River.

== Economy ==
The local people grow industrial crops including tobacco, Tea, peach, Weishan Maojian, tofu, fish, silicon and capsicum annuum, which are important to the local economy.

The region abounds with iron.

== Culture ==
Huaguxi is the most influential form of local theater.

== Transport ==
The Huangcai-Weishan Road runs east to west from Huangcai Town to Weishan Township.

The County Road X107 runs south to north from Xiangzikou Town to Weishan Township, intersecting the County Road X036 and Wu-Min Road.

== Attractions ==
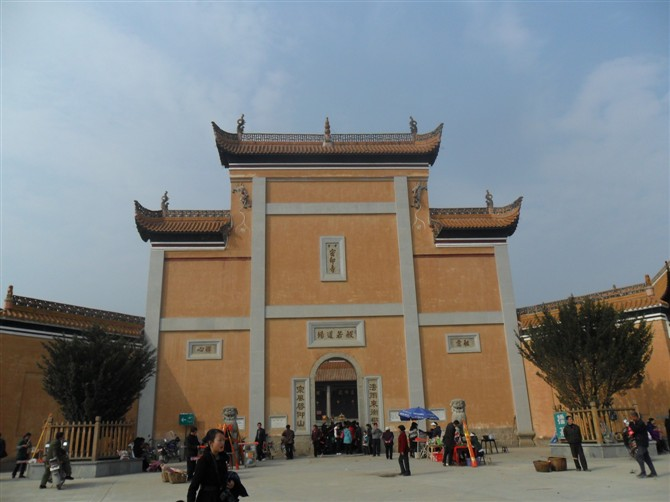
Miyin Temple.

Miyin Temple, was built in 813 on Wei Mountain by Weishan Lingyou, in the eighth year of the Yuanhe era of the Tang dynasty (618–907). It is a well known Buddhist temple associated with Weiyang school in China. The Wei Mountain is also a scenic spot in the township and has water sports such as fishing, boating, and rafting.
