= Zhi-Xun Shen =

Chinese-American physicist

- 沈志勋
- Born: 1962; Zhejiang, China
- Education: Fudan University (BS); Rutgers University (MS); Stanford University (PhD)
- Known for: Angle-resolved photoemission spectroscopy of high-temperature superconductors and quantum materials; microwave impedance microscopy
- Awards: Kamerlingh Onnes Prize (2000); Ernest Orlando Lawrence Award (2009); Oliver E. Buckley Condensed Matter Prize (2011); National Academy of Sciences (2015); Fellow of the Royal Society (2026)
- Scientific career
- Fields: Condensed matter physics
- Workplaces: Stanford University
- Doctoral advisor: Ingolf Lindau; William E. Spicer

Zhi-Xun Shen (Chinese: 沈志勋; born 1962) is a Chinese-American experimental condensed matter physicist. He is the Paul Pigott Professor of Physical Sciences and a professor of applied physics and of physics at Stanford University, and a senior fellow of Stanford’s Precourt Institute for Energy. He is particularly noted for his angle-resolved photoemission spectroscopy (ARPES) studies on high-temperature superconductors. He is a member of the National Academy of Sciences and a Fellow of the Royal Society.

== Life ==
Shen was born in 1962 in Zhejiang, China. He graduated from Fudan University with a B.S. in 1983, and went to the United States through the CUSPEA program organized by T. D. Lee. He earned his M.S. degree in 1985 at Rutgers University. In 1989 he received a PhD in applied physics from Stanford University under Ingolf Lindau and William E. Spicer. In 1991 he became assistant professor, in 1996 associate professor, and in 2000 full professor at Stanford University. At SLAC National Accelerator Laboratory he was chief scientist from 2010 to 2013 and science and technology advisor from 2013 to 2019. He was the founding director of the Stanford Institute for Materials and Energy Sciences (SIMES) from 2006 to 2011. Furthermore, from 2005 to 2008 he was director of the Geballe Laboratory for Advanced Materials. He has held the Paul Pigott Professorship in Physical Sciences since 2006 and is a senior fellow of Stanford’s Precourt Institute for Energy.

== Research ==
Shen’s group uses angle-resolved photoemission spectroscopy and other photon-based techniques, including soft X-ray scattering and time- and spin-resolved spectroscopy, to study quantum materials such as superconductors, magnets and topological insulators.

In 1993, Shen and co-workers reported a strongly anisotropic superconducting gap in Bi_{2}Sr_{2}CaCu_{2}O_{8+δ} (Bi2212), consistent with d-wave pairing.

Over the following decade, Shen and collaborators traced how the electronic structure of a strongly correlated Mott insulator evolves with carrier doping into anomalous metallic and superconducting states. Their studies progressed from measurements of band dispersion in undoped cuprates and electronic reorganization upon doping, published in 1995, to the identification in 1996 of a momentum-dependent normal-state excitation gap in underdoped samples, leaving only a segment of the Fermi surface, now known as the pseudogap and Fermi arc.

Beginning in 2001, Shen’s group also reported evidence for strong electron-phonon coupling in cuprates. In 2004, they identified coupling between electrons and the B_{1g} oxygen-buckling phonon in the antinodal regions of Bi2212, where the superconducting gap is largest. In 2018, they reported evidence suggesting that electron-phonon coupling and electronic correlations act cooperatively to enhance superconductivity. Studies of doped one-dimensional cuprates further elucidated the interplay between electron-phonon coupling and Mott physics.

His group’s measurements of Sr_{2}RuO_{4} and Sr_{2}RhO_{4} demonstrated quantitative agreement with bulk electronic and thermodynamic properties. In 2022, the group further established a connection between ARPES measurements and thermodynamic properties in cuprates.

Shen and collaborators extended these methods to a broader range of quantum materials, including iron-based superconductors, correlated oxides, topological insulators and low-dimensional systems. In 2009, they experimentally identified Bi_{2}Te_{3} as a three-dimensional topological insulator with a single surface Dirac cone. In 2017, they reported evidence for a quantum spin Hall state in monolayer 1T′-WTe_{2}. Their work also explored the interplay between lattice vibrations and electronic correlations. In 2014, the group reported evidence that coupling to phonons in the SrTiO_{3} substrate substantially enhances superconductivity in monolayer FeSe. In 2017, combined time-resolved photoemission and X-ray diffraction measurements quantified electron-phonon coupling in FeSe and demonstrated its enhancement by electronic correlations.

Shen’s group also developed cantilever-based scanning microwave impedance microscopy, a near-field technique for imaging local electrical properties at the nanoscale. He co-authored the 2010 proposal of photon-enhanced thermionic emission for concentrated solar-energy conversion.

Shen has trained numerous graduate students and postdoctoral researchers who have gone on to lead independent research groups at universities and research institutions worldwide.

== Honors ==
- 1993: Sloan Research Fellowship
- 1994: Outstanding Scientific Accomplishment Award, DOE Office of Basic Energy Sciences
- 1999: American Physical Society Centennial Lecturer
- 2000: Kamerlingh Onnes Prize
- 2002: Fellow of the American Physical Society
- 2009: Ernest Orlando Lawrence Award
- 2011: Oliver E. Buckley Condensed Matter Prize, together with Juan Carlos Campuzano and Peter Johnson
- 2014: Investigator, Emerging Phenomena in Quantum Systems initiative, Gordon and Betty Moore Foundation
- 2015: Member of the National Academy of Sciences
- 2017: Fellow of the American Academy of Arts and Sciences; foreign member of the Chinese Academy of Sciences
- 2019-2020: William and Flora Hewlett Foundation Fellow, Radcliffe Institute for Advanced Study
- 2020: Tage Erlander Guest Professorship, Swedish Research Council and KTH Royal Institute of Technology
- 2026: Fellow of the Royal Society
