= Elbio Dagotto =

Argentinian-American theoretical physicist

Elbio Rubén Dagotto
- Occupations: Theoretical physicist and academic
- Awards: David Adler Lectureship Award in the Field of Materials Physics, Fellow of the American Physical Society; Alexander Prize, University of Tennessee; Fellow, American Association for the Advancement of Science

Academic background
- Education: Licenciado (equivalent to USA Master)., Physics; PhD., High Energy Physics
- Alma mater: Institute Balseiro, Bariloche Atomic Centre

Elbio Rubén Dagotto is an Argentinian-American theoretical physicist and academic. He is a distinguished professor in the department of physics and astronomy at the University of Tennessee, Knoxville, and Distinguished Scientist in the Materials Science and Technology Division at the Oak Ridge National Laboratory.

Dagotto is most known for using theoretical models and computational techniques to explore transition metal oxides, oxide interfaces, high-temperature superconductors, topological materials, quantum magnets, and nanoscale systems. He authored the book, Nanoscale Phase Separation and Colossal Magnetoresistance which has focused on transition metal oxides, particularly manganese oxides with the colossal magneto-resistance effect and co-edited the book, Multifunctional Oxide Heterostructures.

Dagotto held appointments as a Member of the Solid State Sciences Committee at the National Academy of Sciences and as a Divisional Editor for Physical Review Letters. He is a Fellow of both the American Association for the Advancement of Science (AAAS) and the American Physical Society (APS), and has also been recognized as an Outstanding Referee by the APS and Europhysics Letters (EPL). Furthermore, he is the recipient of the 2023 David Adler Lectureship Award in the Field of Materials Physics and recipient of the 2023 Alexander Prize of the University of Tennessee.

== Education and career ==
Dagotto studied physics at the Institute Balseiro, Bariloche Atomic Centre, Bariloche, Argentina, where he received the title of Licenciado. Continuing in the Centro Atomico Bariloche, he received his PhD in the field of High Energy Physics, specifically in lattice gauge theories. He then moved as postdoctoral researcher to the department of physics, University of Illinois at Urbana-Champaign under the supervision of Eduardo Fradkin and John Kogut. His second postdoctoral appointment was at the Kavli Institute for Theoretical Physics, at the University of California, Santa Barbara, where he collaborated with Douglas James Scalapino, John Robert Schrieffer and Robert Sugar.

Dagotto became assistant, associate and then full professor at the department of physics, Florida State University. There, he was associated with the National High Magnetic Field Laboratory, working in the theory group. He works in a Correlated Electron Group with Adriana Moreo, and has had a joint appointment between the University of Tennessee (UT), Knoxville, and Oak Ridge National Laboratory (ORNL) since 2004.

== Research ==
Dagotto's research has primarily focused on strongly correlated electronic materials, and lately in quantum materials, where correlation and topological effects are intertwined. In the presence of strong correlation, the interactions between electrons play a crucial role and the one-electron approximation, used for example in semiconductors, is no longer valid. In this framework, he has worked on theories for many families of materials, such as high critical temperature superconductors and manganese oxides with the colossal magnetoresistance. The overarching theme of his work is that correlated electrons must be considered in the broader context of complexity. As described by Philip W. Anderson in his publication, "More Is Different" having simple fundamental interactions among particles does not imply the ability to reconstruct their collective properties. Dagotto argued that in correlated electronic systems, similar emergence occurs, and these complex systems spontaneously form complicated states and self-organize in patterns impossible to predict by mere inspection of the simple electron-electron interactions involved. Because of its intrinsic difficulty, to study complexity and emergence in quantum materials the use of computational techniques is crucial. He has employed Monte Carlo, density matrix renormalization group, and Lanczos methods. Together with collaborators, he also developed new algorithms to study systems described by spin-fermion models, with a mixture of quantum and classical degrees of freedom, such as in the double exchange context used for materials in the central part of the 3d row of the periodic table.

== Scientific work ==
In 1992, Dagotto, in collaboration with José Riera and Doug Scalapino, opened the field of ladder compounds, materials with atomic substructures containing two chains next to each other and with inter-ladder coupling (along rungs) of magnitude comparable to that in the long direction (along legs). This research was the first to demonstrate that the transition from one chain to a full two-dimensional plane was not a smooth process simply involving the addition of one chain to another. Instead, it was revealed that even and odd number of chains (called legs due to its ladder-like geometry) belong to classes with quite different behavior. The even-leg ladders, with two legs being the most dramatic case, were theoretically predicted by Dagotto to display a spin gap, spin liquid properties, and tendencies toward superconductivity upon hole doping, all properties confirmed experimentally in materials of the family of copper-based high critical superconductors. Even in the more recently discovered iron-based high critical temperature superconductor, the "123" materials such as BaFe2S3 with ladder geometry also display superconductivity under high pressure.

Dagotto employed computational techniques to study model Hamiltonians for high critical temperature superconductors based on copper, thus reducing the uncertainty in the analysis of these models when employing other approximations, such as mean field or variational methods. In 1990, he along with research collaborators, and other groups independently, realized that the dominant attractive channel for Cooper pairs of holes in an antiferromagnetic background is the d_{x2-y2} channel. In 1990, he studied dynamical properties of the Hubbard model and t-J model computationally, addressing photoemission dispersions and quasiparticle weights.

In 1998, Dagotto developed the Monte Carlo techniques that allowed for the first computational studies of spin-fermion models for manganites, in collaboration with Seiji Yunoki and Adriana Moreo. Employing these techniques, phase separation involving electronic degrees of freedom, dubbed "electronic phase separation" was discovered. The computational techniques developed by him and research collaborators unveiled the strong competition between a ferromagnetic metallic state and complex charge-orbital-spin ordered insulating states, providing the explanation for the colossal magnetoresistance effect in manganites. More recently, similar Monte Carlo techniques have been employed by him and collaborators to study properties of iron-based superconductors, revealing the role of the lattice to stabilize the electronic nematic regime above the antiferromagnetic critical temperature.

In a highly cited 2005 publication, Dagotto argued that the electronic degree of freedom in transition metal oxides and related materials displays characteristics similar to those of soft matter, where complex patterns arise from deceptively simple interactions.

In 2006, Dagotto and Ivan Sergienko developed a theory to understand the multiferroic properties of narrow bandwidth perovskites and other oxides. Their spin arrangements break inversion symmetry, and this triggers ferroelectric properties, leading to multiferroics, which are materials with both magnetic and ferroelectric properties. He, along with Ivan Sergienko, Cengiz Sen, Silvia Picozzi and collaborators also proposed magnetostriction as a mechanism for multiferroicity.

Dagotto made several other contributions to theoretical condensed matter physics. Together with Pengcheng Dai and Jiangping Hu, in 2012 they were among the first to argue that the iron based high critical temperature superconductors are not located in the weak Hubbard coupling limit. Instead they are in the intermediate Hubbard coupling regime, thus requiring a combination of localized and itinerant degrees of freedom. In particular, iron selenides are an example of materials where electronic correlations and spin frustration cannot be ignored. With Julian Rincon, Jacek Herbrych and collaborators, employing the density matrix renormalization group, they computationally discovered "block" states in low-dimensional multi-orbital Hubbard models. Spin blocks are groups of spin that are aligned ferromagnetically, anti-ferro coupled among them, and they display exotic dynamical spin structure factors with a mixture of spin waves and optical modes.

Among the related findings, Herbrych, Dagotto and collaborators revealed the existence of a spin spiral made out of blocks, a state never reported before. When this spiral one-dimensional state is placed over a two-dimensional superconducting plane, Majorana fermions developed at the chain by proximity effect from the plane, and for this reason this chain-plane geometry has potential value in topological quantum computing. He, together with Narayan Mohanta and Satoshi Okamoto, also reported Majoranas in a two-dimensional three-layer geometry with a skyrmion crystal at the bottom, an electron gas in the middle, and a standard superconductor at the top with a carved one-dimensional channel. Within topology in one dimension, he, Nirav Patel, and collaborators proposed a fermionic two-orbital electronic model that becomes the S=1 Haldane chain in strong Hubbard coupling, and has similarities with the AKLT state of spin systems. The proposed fermionic model has a spin gap and spin liquid properties, as the Haldane chain, and it is quite different from the S=1/2 Heisenberg chain. Moreover, he and collaborators predicted superconductivity upon hole doping, similarly as it occurs in ladders due to the existence of preformed spin ½ singlets in the ground state as in a resonant valence bond state.

Dagotto also contributed to theoretical aspects of oxide interfaces, where oxides are grown one over the other creating interfaces where reconstructions of the spin, charge, orbital, and lattice can occur. Together with Shuai Dong and collaborators, he showed that a superlattice made of insulating Mn-oxide components becomes globally metallic in the new geometry. He has also worked in skyrmions. In the early stages of his career, he made contributions: to particle physics in the context of lattice gauge theories, to the interface between particle physics and condensed matter, and to frustrated spin systems.

== Personal life ==
Dagotto is married to Adriana Moreo, another physicist with whom he has two children; they met as undergraduates at the Balseiro Institute.

== Awards and honors ==
- 1998 – Fellow, American Physical Society
- 2006 – Member, Solid State Sciences Committee of the National Academy of Sciences
- 2008 – Outstanding Referee, American Physical Society (APS)
- 2010 – Fellow, American Association for the Advancement of Science (AAAS)
- 2012 – Outstanding Referee, Europhysics Letters (EPL)
- 2019, 2021, 2023 – Teacher of the year award, University of Tennessee
- 2023 – David Adler Lectureship Award in the Field of Materials Physics, American Physical Society with citation "For pioneering work on the theoretical framework of correlated electron systems and describing their importance through elegant written and oral communications."
- 2023 – Alexander Prize, University of Tennessee

== Bibliography ==
=== Books ===
- Nanoscale Phase Separation and Colossal Magnetoresistance (2003) ISBN 9783540432456
- Multifunctional Oxide Heterostructures (2012) ISBN 9780199584123

=== Selected articles ===
- Dagotto, E., Riera, J., & Scalapino, D. (1992). Superconductivity in ladders and coupled planes. Physical Review B, 45(10), 5744.
- Barnes, T., Dagotto, E., Riera, J., & Swanson, E. S. (1993). Excitation spectrum of Heisenberg spin ladders. Physical Review B, 47(6), 3196.
- Dagotto, E. (1994). Correlated electrons in high-temperature superconductors. Reviews of Modern Physics, 66(3), 763.
- Dagotto, E., & Rice, T. M. (1996). Surprises on the way from one-to two-dimensional quantum magnets: The ladder materials. Science, 271(5249), 618–623.
- Yunoki, S., Hu, J., Malvezzi, A. L., Moreo, A., Furukawa, N., & Dagotto, E. (1998). Phase separation in electronic models for manganites. Physical Review Letters, 80(4), 845.
- Moreo, A., Yunoki, S., & Dagotto, E. (1999). Phase separation scenario for manganese oxides and related materials. Science, 283(5410), 2034–2040.
- Dagotto, E., Hotta, T., & Moreo, A. (2001). Colossal magnetoresistant materials: the key role of phase separation. Physics Reports, 344(1–3), 1–153.
- Dagotto, E. (2005). Complexity in strongly correlated electronic systems. Science, 309(5732), 257–262.
- Sergienko, I. A., & Dagotto, E. (2006). Role of the Dzyaloshinskii-Moriya interaction in multiferroic perovskites. Physical Review B, 73(9), 094434.
- Dai, P., Hu, J., & Dagotto, E. (2012). Magnetism and its microscopic origin in iron-based high-temperature superconductors. Nature Physics, 8(10), 709–718.
