= Liang Mong Song =

Taiwanese engineer (born 1952)

- 梁孟松
- Born: 1952 (age 73–74); Taiwan
- Education: National Cheng Kung University (BS, MS); University of California, Berkeley (PhD)
- Title: Co-CEO of Semiconductor Manufacturing International Corporation
- Scientific career
- Fields: Electrical engineering
- Thesis: Current, field stress-induced degradation in thin gate-oxide MOSFETs (1984)
- Doctoral advisor: Chenming Hu

Liang Mong Song is a Taiwanese electronic engineer. He is the co-chief executive officer of the Semiconductor Manufacturing International Corporation. He was previously an engineer at TSMC and Samsung Electronics.

He is known as one of the "Six Knights of TSMC R&D".

== Early life and education ==
Liang was born in Taiwan in 1952. His father was Liang Chao-chu and his mother was Liang Shih Ing-ing.

Liang graduated from National Cheng Kung University with a bachelor's degree and master's degree in electrical engineering. He then completed doctoral studies in the United States at the University of California, Berkeley, where he studied under Chenming Hu. He earned his Ph.D. in electrical engineering from Berkeley in 1984. His doctoral dissertation was titled, "Current, Field Stress-Induced Degradation in Thin Gate-Oxide MOSFETs".

== Career ==
After obtaining a doctorate in electrical engineering, Liang was elected as a fellow of the Institute of Electrical and Electronics Engineers. He was responsible for the memory-related work of ultra-micro semiconductors.

According to the data of the United States Patent and Trademark Office, Liang owns 181 semiconductor technology patents, all of which are key technical research. He has published more than 350 technical papers in Taiwan and the United States.

=== Work at TSMC ===
After returning to Taiwan in 1992, Liang served as an engineer and senior R&D director of TSMC. He is credited with nearly 500 TSMC patents, and was responsible for or participated in the most advanced development of each generation of TSMC's manufacturing processes. In 2003, TSMC defeated IBM with its own technology. Among the TSMC R&D teams commended by the Executive Yuan, Liang Mengsong, who was responsible for the 130-nanometer "copper process" advanced module, ranked second in contribution only behind his boss, Chiang Shang-yi.

In 2005, when Morris Chang named Rick Tsai to succeed him as CEO, Liang expected to be promoted to R&D Vice President. However he was passed over, leaving Liang furious. In February 2009, Liang Mong Song left TSMC and joined National Tsing Hua University as a professor in the Department of Electrical Engineering and Institute of Electronics. He left for South Korea more than half a year later.

=== Switch to Samsung Electronics ===
Under the conditions that Samsung Electronics offered Liang three years' salary equivalent to his ten years of service at TSMC, Liang agreed to join Samsung and at the same time took away more than 20 employees, including those from his old TSMC engineering department.

To comply with the period stipulated in the non-compete clause, Liang began to work as a visiting professor at Sungkyunkwan University under Samsung in October 2010, and actually taught at Samsung's internal corporate training university - Samsung Semiconductor Institute of Technology. On 13 July 2011, Liang officially joined Samsung as the chief technology officer of Samsung's LSI department and was also the executive vice president of Samsung's wafer foundry.

At that time, Samsung was at the R&D bottleneck of switching from the 28 nm process to the 20-nanometer process. Liang advocated that Samsung abandon the 20 nm process and directly upgrade from the 28 nm process to the 14 nm process. In the end, Samsung's 14 nm process was mass-produced about half a year earlier than TSMC.

After Liang assisted Samsung in successfully developing the 14 nm process, Samsung won the first batch of orders for the Apple A9 and Qualcomm's order, which were originally exclusive to TSMC in the Apple processor-related market. This caused TSMC's stock price to fall for a time, losing 80% of Apple's orders and losing US$1 billion. In October 2011, TSMC launched a four-year-old lawsuit against Liang, accusing him of supposedly leaking TSMC's business secrets to Samsung.

=== TSMC Lawsuit ===
During his tenure at Samsung Electronics, Liang rapidly narrowed the technology gap between Samsung and TSMC, which caused TSMC to believe that Liang was suspected of leaking trade secrets and filed a lawsuit against him. TSMC alleged in the lawsuit that from 2005 to 2009, Samsung Electronics' annual foundry revenue was less than US$400 million. Since 2010, after Samsung began to be OEM for Apple's A-series processors, its foundry revenue increased to US$1.2 billion (of which US$800 million was Apple related), reaching US$3.95 billion in 2013. South Korea entered the wafer foundry industry where a few companies have the ability to compete and by 2018, Samsung's foundry revenue climbed to approximately US$10 billion, and was attempting to surpass TSMC in the 3 nm process. TSMC believed that Samsung's development was closely related to Liang joining. TSMC stated even if Liang did not leak any trade secrets, he helped advise them on the direction to take which would save a lot of time and resources.

An expert technical investigation report commissioned by TSMC showed that because Samsung's product technology was licensed from IBM, its product features were originally the same as those of IBM, but very different from those of TSMC. In the years after 2009, the differences between the product features of Samsung and TSMC were sharply reduced and became extremely similar. External experts in the survey report used state-of-the-art electron microscopes to compare in detail the main structural features and component materials of the latest four-generation products of IBM, TSMC and Samsung. The results showed that Samsung and TSMC's products are highly similar so TSMC determined that Liang had leaked relevant business secrets to Samsung causing it to catch up with TSMC.

TSMC's lawsuit against Liang failed in the first instance of the Intellectual Property Court of Taiwan. The court agreed with Liang's attorney Wellington Koo and ruled that the non-compete period had expired and his right to work should not be deprived. TSMC appealed against the verdict. In the second instance the court sided with TSMC as it found Sungkyunkwan University had a special relationship with Samsung. Liang refused to accept the appeal, and the final verdict of the Supreme Court was Liang could not continue to provide services to Samsung in any way until after the end of 2015. The judgment was also the first time in Taiwan's court history that senior corporate executives were prohibited from working for a competitor company after the non-compete period has expired. Some media commented it as a "historic judgment".

=== Move to SMIC ===
In 2015, Liang had left Samsung. In 2017 he was hired at Semiconductor Manufacturing International Corporation Co-CEO. After he joined, SMIC improved the yield of its mass production and shrank the size of its chips. He pushed for smaller chips which prompted clashes with SMIC executives and shareholders who also wanted to focus on less-advanced but profitable areas.

In late 2020, Liang complained he wasn't consulted when SMIC brought in his former boss Chiang Shang-yi as deputy chairman. A letter containing his grievances was published online in Chinese media. He also wrote that he had led a team to complete the development of 7 nm process at SMIC.

In 2022, Liang was still with SMIC and the 7 nm process was completed. Chiang was no longer with SMIC.
