= Richard Chang =

Richard Chang may refer to:

- Richard Sui On Chang (1941–2017), American Roman Catholic bishop
- Richard Chang Ru-gin (born 1948), Chinese businessman, founder of Semiconductor Manufacturing International Corporation
- Richard Chang (Costco) (born 1967), Taiwanese American basketball player and Costco executive
- Richard Chang Hung-pen, co-founder of ASE Group
