= Picozzi =

Picozzi is an Italian surname. Notable people with the surname include:

- Bob Picozzi (born 1951), American television and radio announcer
- Joe Picozzi (born 1990s), American politician
- Silvia Picozzi, Italian physicist
