= Sophie Chang =

Sophie Chang may refer to:

- Sophie Chang (tennis)
- Sophie Chang (philanthropist)

== See also ==
- Sophia Chang, Canadian-Korean music director and producer
