= Michael Duryea Williams =

American physicist and AVS president

Michael D. Williams
- Born: 1957 (age 68–69); Dothan, Alabama
- Education: Morehouse College; Georgia Institute of Technology; Stanford University
- Scientific career
- Workplaces: Clark Atlanta University
- Thesis: The Effect of Chemical Reactivity and Charge Transfer on Gallium-Arsenide (110) Schottky Barrier Formation (1987)
- Doctoral advisor: William E. Spicer

Michael Duryea Williams (born 1957) is an American physicist, professor at Clark Atlanta University, and current president of the AVS: Science and Technology of Materials, Interfaces, and Processing (formerly American Vacuum Society). He is the first African American president of AVS.

== Early life and education ==
Williams was born in Dothan, Alabama, and attended Dothan High School.

Williams attended Morehouse College and the Georgia Institute of Technology in Atlanta, Georgia, for his undergraduate studies. He received dual bachelor's degrees in 1979, with a B.S. in physics from Morehouse College and a B.S. in nuclear engineering from the Georgia Institute of Technology. While at Morehouse College, Williams received the Max C. Fleishman scholarship and was a member of the Society of Physics Students and the Atlanta University Center photography club.

He then went on to earn a master's degree and PhD in physics at Stanford University in Palo Alto, California. His thesis at Stanford was titled "The Effect of Chemical Reactivity and Charge Transfer on Gallium-Arsenide (110) Schottky Barrier Formation." His doctoral advisor was William E. Spicer and he received his PhD in 1987. His co-advisor was Arthur Schawlow, and he also studied under professors Ingolf Lindau, Piero Pianetta, C. Robert Helms and Walter Harrison while at Stanford.

== Career ==
Following graduation, Williams completed an appointment as a visiting scientist at IBM's Almaden Research Center in San Jose, California, and subsequently began working at the Optoelectronics Research Department of AT&T Bell Laboratories (now Bell Labs) in 1987.

In 2002, Williams became chair of the Committee on Minorities of the American Physical Society. The COM bestows the annual Edward A. Bouchet Award, and Williams also organized a session titled "The New Face of Physics," which included discussions on the demographics of minorities in physics.

Williams joined the faculty at Clark Atlanta University in 1994, where he teaches currently. He began as an associate professor of physics and director of the Center of Excellence in Microelectronics and Photonics. He is professor and chair of the physics department and director of the Center for Excellence in Materials Physics (CEMP) at Clark Atlanta University. He is also a member of Clark Atlanta's Faculty Research Council.

Williams has been a part of numerous professional organizations throughout his career, including AVS and the American Physical Society. He is also a member of Sigma Pi Sigma, Beta Kappa Chi, and Sigma Xi honor societies, and served on the National Academy of Sciences’ Board of Army Science and Technology study committee for a review of directed energy technology.

In 2014, Williams was elected to the board of directors of the AVS. Previously, he served in AVS roles including director, trustee, liaison to the AIP Liaison Committee on Under-represented Minorities, executive officer for the electronics materials and processing division, chair of the AVS diversity and inclusion committee, chair of the AVS chapters, divisions and groups (CDG) committee and chair of the governance committee. In 2021, he became an AVS fellow, and in 2022 was the society's president-elect. In 2023 he began his term as AVS president. Upon becoming president, Williams became the first African American person to lead AVS.

== Research ==
Williams' research has focused on "achieving a fundamental understanding of the physical processes, growth morphology, interfacial strain and electronic structure modifications that occur at the surfaces and interfaces of epitaxially grown films and semiconductors," as well as the processing and growth morphology of 2-D metal dichalcogenides.

Williams developed a free-standing quantum well (FSQW) for use in laser technology, and was awarded a patent for this concept.

== Selected publications ==
- Schwaigert, Tobias; Salmani-Rezaie, Salva; Barone, Matthew R.; Paik, Hanjong; Ray, Ethan; Williams, Michael D. (March 2023). "Molecular beam epitaxy of KTaO 3". Journal of Vacuum Science & Technology A. 41 (2): 022703. arXiv:2212.14300. Bibcode:2023JVSTA..41b2703S. doi:10.1116/6.0002223. S2CID 255340607.
- Williams, M. D. (1 November 2008). "Investigation of negative electron affinity in hydrogen complex deactivated surface of InP:Zn (100)". Journal of Vacuum Science & Technology A: Vacuum, Surfaces, and Films. 26 (6): 1542–1545. Bibcode:2008JVSTA..26.1542W. doi:10.1116/1.2998809.
- "Growth and Characterization of III-V Semiconductors for Device Applications." (2000)
