= Adriana Moreo =

Argentine-American physicist

- Education: Balseiro Institute
- Spouse: Elbio Dagotto
- Awards: Fellow of the American Association for the Advancement of Science (2018) Fellow of the American Physical Society (2002)
- Scientific career
- Fields: Theoretical Condensed Matter Physics
- Workplaces: Professor, University of Tennessee Department of Physics and Astronomy (2004-present) Professor, Florida State University (1999-2004) Associate Professor, Florida State University (1994-1999) Assistant Professor, Florida State University (1992-1994) Research Associate in Physics, University of California, Santa Barbara (1988-1991) Research Associate in Physics, University of Illinois (1985-1988)
- Thesis: (1985)

Adriana Moreo is an Argentine-American condensed matter physicist whose research involves the computer simulation of superconductors, oxides of transition metals, graphene, and other strongly correlated materials. She is a professor in the Department of Physics & Astronomy at the University of Tennessee and a member of the research staff in the Materials Science and Technology Division of the Oak Ridge National Laboratory.

== Education and career ==
Moreo studied physics at the Balseiro Institute, earning a licenciado en Fisica in 1983 and completing a Ph.D. in 1985. After postdoctoral research with Eduardo Fradkin at the University of Illinois Urbana-Champaign, and then at the University of California, Santa Barbara from 1988-1991, she became an assistant professor at Florida State University in 1992. She was promoted to associate professor in 1994 and full professor in 1999. In 2004 she moved to her present position in the Department of Physics and Astronomy at the University of Tennessee. Her research focuses on a wide variety of subjects such as: Quantum Materials, Strongly correlated electron systems: high Tc superconductors (cuprates, iron pnictides, iron selenides), manganites with colossal magnetoresistance, magnetism, topological materials, numerical calculations, and computational physics.

== Recognition ==
Moreo was named a Fellow of the American Physical Society (APS) in 2002, after a nomination from the APS Division of Condensed Matter Physics, "for important contributions to computational techniques and their application to the manganites, d-wave superconductors and other correlated electronic systems". She was named as a Fellow of the American Association for the Advancement of Science in 2018.

== Personal life ==
Moreo is married to Elbio Dagotto, another physicist, whom she met when they were both undergraduates in Argentina.
