= Semiconductor Manufacturing International Corporation =

Chinese semiconductor foundry

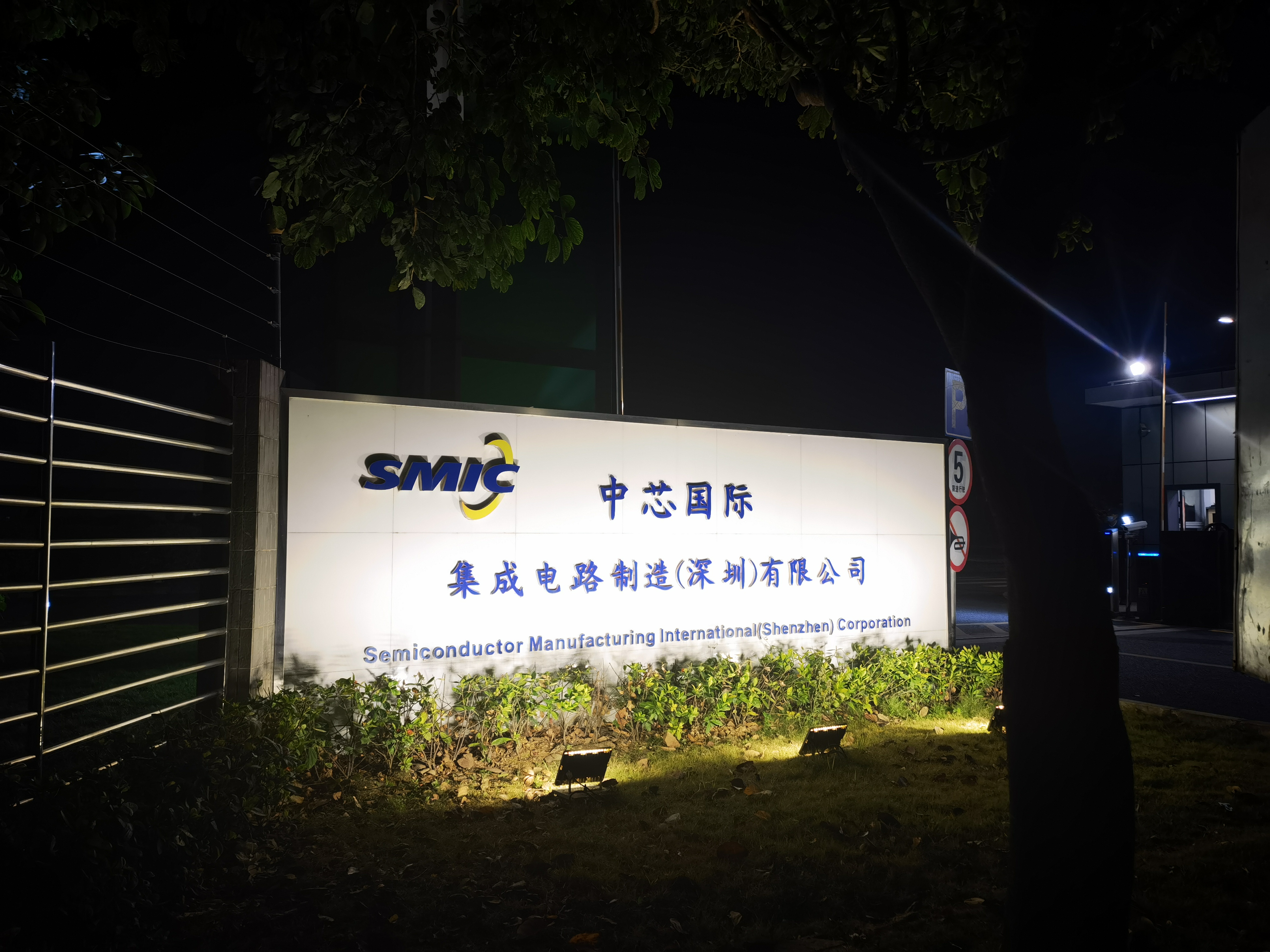
- SMIC's "SZ" Fabrication Facility in Shenzhen, China
- Native name: 中芯国际集成电路制造有限公司 (中芯国际)
- Type: Public; State-owned enterprise
- Traded as: SSE: 688981 (A share); SEHK: 981 (H share); CSI A50
- Industry: Semiconductors
- Founded: April 3, 2000; 26 years ago Cayman Islands (legal domicile)
- Founder: Zhang Rujing
- Headquarters: Shanghai, China
- Key people: Haijun Zhao (Co-CEO); Liang Mong Song (Co-CEO)
- Revenue: ▲US$9.33 billion (2025)
- Net income: ▲US$685 million (2025)
- Number of employees: 19,952 (2025)
- Website: www.smics.com

Semiconductor Manufacturing International Corporation (SMIC) is a partially state-owned publicly listed Chinese pure-play semiconductor foundry company. It is the largest contract chip maker in mainland China.

SMIC is headquartered in Shanghai and incorporated in the Cayman Islands. It has wafer fabrication sites throughout mainland China, offices in the United States, Italy, Japan, and Taiwan, and a representative office in Hong Kong. It provides integrated circuit (IC) manufacturing services from 350 nm to 7 nm process technologies. The Financial Times reported that SMIC is expected to offer 5 nm process-node IC manufacturing services in 2024.

State-owned civilian and military telecommunications equipment provider Datang Telecom Group as well as the China Integrated Circuit Industry Investment Fund are major shareholders of SMIC. Notable customers include Huawei, Qualcomm, Broadcom, and Texas Instruments. SMIC is a major shareholder and supplier to Brite Semiconductor. In response to US sanctions on the Chinese chip industry in the early 2020s, SMIC began a wave of expansion in the form of joint ventures with China's state semiconductor fund. As of 2024, it is the world's third largest contract chip maker.

== History ==
SMIC was founded on April 3, 2000, and is headquartered in Shanghai. It was incorporated in the Cayman Islands as a limited liability company. It quickly built a fully owned plant in Shanghai, acquired a Motorola plant in Tianjin, and then began to build a fully owned plant in Beijing. SMIC also became involved in two projects in Chengdu and Wuhan, which reversed a common pattern in Chinese development of government building, operating, then transferring industrial projects, such that SMIC operated the company, but the capital costs were borne by municipal government, relieving SMIC of the major cost of its fab plants.

In September 2003, SMIC raised $630 million in funding from investors, including: Walden International (a venture capital firm based in San Francisco, California), Oak Investment Partners, Temasek, Vertex Israel and others.

On June 23, 2015, Huawei, Qualcomm Global Trading Pte. Ltd., IMEC International, and SMIC announced the formation of the SMIC Advanced Technology Research & Development (Shanghai) Corporation, an equity joint venture company.

On October 14, 2016, Ningbo Semiconductor International Corporation was jointly established by China IC Capital (the wholly owned investment fund of SMIC), Ningbo Senson Electronics Technology Co., Ltd, and Beijing Integrated Circuit Design and Testing Fund with a registered capital of RMB355 million, equal to US$52.8 million. SMIC holds 66.76% of the ownership interest. NSI will develop analog and specialty semiconductor process technology platforms in the areas of high-voltage analog, radio frequency, and optoelectronics. These developments will support customers in IC design and product development for applications in smart home, industrial, and automotive electronics, new generations of radio communications, augmented reality, virtual reality, mixed reality, and other specialty systems.

In 2018, SMIC had gross profits of $747 million and net profits of $149, with $3.6 billion in revenues. It apparently spend around $550 million on research and development, or about 16 percent of sales. On 9 March 2018, SMIC and the government of Shaoxing established a joint venture, United Nova Technology. On May 18, 2018, ground was broken on the manufacturing base for SMIC in Shaoxing. SMIC was building a plant that would be the first in China to use 14-nanometer production technology. The company said it would increase its investment capacity by 20% in February 2019.

Current co-CEOs are Zhao Haijun and Mong Song Liang. Zixue Zhou serves as chairman of the board. In May 2019, it was said that SMIC's co-chiefs, Zhao Haijun and Liang Mong-song were at odds over how to focus the company.

On May 24, 2019, SMIC announced it would voluntarily delist from the New York Stock Exchange (NYSE), citing low trade volumes. Along with low US trading volumes, the company named the high administrative cost of maintaining the NYSE listing.; it joined the exchange 15 years before. The delisting followed Huawei's blacklisting by the United States government.

In 2019, Qualcomm, Huawei, and IMEC were still minority shareholders in SMIC's R&D arm.

In May 2020, in support of the country's Made in China 2025 program; the China Integrated Circuit Industry Investment Fund and the Shanghai Integrated Circuit Industry Investment Fund invested a combined US$2 billion, gaining, respectively, 23.08% and 11.54% ownership of SMIC. In July 2020 SMIC issued 1,685,620,000 shares at 27.46 yuan per share on the STAR Market of the Shanghai Stock Exchange, raising 46.28 billion yuan ($6.62 billion).

On July 21, 2022, the company established 7 nm technology. This technology was achieved in two years.

=== Litigation with TSMC ===
The company was the target of a lawsuit brought by TSMC, accusing SMIC of misappropriating TSMC intellectual property. The first round of litigation ended in 2005 with a $175 million settlement. A second round was opened in 2006. The liability phase of the lawsuit began on September 9, 2009, in Oakland, California, and the jury found SMIC liable on 61 out of 65 claims. SMIC entered into a settlement agreement with TSMC to resolve all pending lawsuits between the parties.

=== Sanctions ===
==== Taiwan ====
In June 2025, Taiwan added SMIC to its export control list.

==== United States ====
In September 2020, the United States Department of Commerce declared SMIC a military end-user and required that American technology companies dealing with it obtain a license. The action elicited a rebuke from China's Foreign Ministry spokesman Zhao Lijian.

On 4 October 2020, SMIC stated that the U.S. Bureau of Industry and Security had informed some of SMIC's suppliers that according to U.S. export control regulations they must apply for an export license in advance before supplying SMIC with some American equipment, accessories and original products. In December 2020, the United States Department of Defense named SMIC as a company "owned or controlled" by the People's Liberation Army and thereby prohibited any American company or individual from investing in it.

In December 2020, the United States Department of Commerce added SMIC to the Bureau of Industry and Security's Entity List.

On 6 September 2023, Huawei launched its new Mate 60 smartphone. The phone was powered by a new Kirin 9000s chip, made in China by SMIC. This processor was the first to use the new 7 nm SMIC technology. TechInsights had stated in 2022 that it believed SMIC had managed to produce 7 nm chips, even though faced by a harsh sanctions regime, by adapting simpler machines that it could still purchase from ASML. Holger Mueller of Constellation Research Inc. said that this showed that the US sanctions might have had the effect of sending China's chip-making industry into overdrive. In 2023, with the release of Huawei's Mate 60 Pro, a phone that contained a chip that may violate current trade restrictions, U.S. Congressman Mike Gallagher said that, "U.S. Commerce Department should end all technology exports to Huawei and China's top semiconductor firm following the discovery of new chips in Huawei phones," and that, "this chip likely could not be produced without US technology and thus SMIC may have violated the Department of Commerce's Foreign Direct Product Rule."

In March 2026, during the Iran war, the U.S. accused SMIC of providing chipmaking tools to Iran's military.

== Processes ==
Quarterly Wafer revenue by process node
Node	Q3 2021	Q3 2020	Q3 2019	Q3 2018
FinFET/28 nm	18.2%	14.6%	4.3%	7.1%
40/45 nm	13.9%	17.2%	18.5%	18.7%
55/65 nm	28.5%	25.8%	29.3%	21.0%
90 nm	3.1%	3.4%	1.3%	1.4%
0.11/0.13 μm	5.4%	4.4%	6.6%	8.7%
0.15/0.18 μm	27.9%	31.2%	35.8%	39.5%
0.25/0.35 μm	3.0%	3.4%	4.2%	3.6%

=== 14 nm ===
On 14 November 2019, SMIC announced that volume production of 14 nm FinFET had begun.

=== N+1 ===
N+1 is the follow-on to SMIC's 14 nm process, and is targeted for inexpensive chips.

SMIC ordered an EUV step-and-scan system from ASML Holding for $120 million in 2018. The order was blocked after the US government pressured the Netherlands and ASML.

=== N+2 ===
In 2021, SMIC started shipping 7 nm chips.

=== N+3 ===
In February 2024, the Financial Times reported that SMIC is on track to mass-produce logic chips equivalent in performance to the 5 nm process node later in 2024; additional reports speculated that the 5 nm chips will be manufactured via stockpiled ASML "deep ultra-violet" (DUV) immersion lithography machines. The new chips are expected to be produced at SMIC's new Shanghai production lines for lead customer HiSilicon (Huawei's chip designing arm). It is likely that SMIC's new 5 nm-node processors will be employed for AI-training and to power smartphones.

According to a Chinese patent granted in late 2023 to a company working with Huawei Technologies, certain transistors and interconnects feature sizes seen on chips in the 5 nm-node can be obtained using DUV immersion machines and a technique called "self-aligned quadruple patterning" (SAQP).

In December 2025, TechInsights announced that it has conducted an exploratory teardown and analysis of the Kirin 9030 processor which powers Huawei's Mate 80 Pro Max smartphone, launched in November 2025. TechInsights' analysis confirmed that the Kirin 9030 is manufactured using SMIC's N+3 process, a "scaled evolution" of SMIC's 7 nm class process and indicates that SMIC is approaching "true 5nm-equivalent node without EUV lithography."

== See also ==
- Semiconductor industry
- Semiconductor industry in China
- Shanghai Micro Electronics Equipment
- List of semiconductor fabrication plants
