= Kamerlingh Onnes Prize =

The Heike Kamerlingh Onnes Prize was established in 2000, under the sponsorship of Elsevier, by the organizers of the International Conference on the Materials and Mechanisms of Superconductivity (M^{2}S). The prize is named in honor of Heike Kamerlingh Onnes, who discovered superconductivity in 1911. At each conference, the prize, which consists of 7500 € and a certificate, is presented to one or more physicists. If there are two or more recipients they share the money. The prize "recognizes outstanding experiments which illuminate the nature of superconductivity other than materials". The winners are selected by the members of the Kamerlingh Onnes Prize Committee, appointed by the conference organizers.

The prize was first awarded in 2000 at the 6th International Conference on Materials and Mechanisms of Superconductivity and High Temperature Superconductors:

The new H. Kamerlingh Onnes Prize for outstanding experiments that illuminate the nature of superconductivity other than materials, was established by Elsevier Science, publisher of Physica C-Superconductivity and its Applications. The first H. Kamerlingh Onnes Prize was awarded to Zhi-Xun Shen.

The prize is "one of the leading awards for experimental research in superconductivity."

== Recipients ==
The following are recipients:

Year	Name	Citation
2000	Zhi-Xun Shen	"For elucidating the electron structure of high-temperature superconductors and other strongly interacting electron materials by angular resolved photoelectron spectroscopy."
2003	George Crabtree	"For pioneering and seminal experiments which elucidated the vortex phase diagram in high temperature superconductors under various conditions of disorder and anisotropy."
2003	Eli Zeldov	"For pioneering and seminal experiments which elucidated the vortex phase diagram in high temperature superconductors under various conditions of disorder and anisotropy."
2006	N. Phuan Ong	"For pioneering and seminal transport experiments which illuminated the unconventional nature of the metallic state of high temperature superconducting cuprates."
2006	Hidenori Takagi	"For pioneering and seminal transport experiments which illuminated the unconventional nature of the metallic state of high temperature superconducting cuprates."
2006	Shin-ichi Uchida	"For pioneering and seminal transport experiments which illuminated the unconventional nature of the metallic state of high temperature superconducting cuprates."
2009	J.C. Séamus Davis	"For pioneering and seminal experiments which illuminate the nature of superconductivity in strongly correlated electron systems."
2009	Aharon Kapitulnik	"For pioneering and seminal experiments which illuminate the nature of superconductivity in strongly correlated electron systems."
2009	John Tranquada	"For pioneering and seminal experiments which illuminate the nature of superconductivity in strongly correlated electron systems."
2012	Herbert A. Mook	"For their long-term outstanding and pioneering contributions to the experimental superconductivity research."
2012	Teunis M. Klapwijk	"For their long-term outstanding and pioneering contributions to the experimental superconductivity research."
2012	Øystein H. Fischer	"For their long-term outstanding and pioneering contributions to the experimental superconductivity research."
2015	Gilbert G, Lonzarich	"For visionary experiments concerning the emergence of superconductivity among strongly renormalized quasiparticles at the edge of magnetic order."
2018	Yuji Matsuda	"For illuminating the nature of superconductivity in unconventional superconductors."
2018	Louis Taillefer	"For illuminating the nature of superconductivity in unconventional superconductors."
2022	Bernhard Keimer	"For experiments determining spin and charge correlations in high temperature superconductors using x-ray and neutron scattering."
2022	Giacomo Ghiringhelli	"For experiments determining spin and charge correlations in high temperature superconductors using x-ray and neutron scattering."
2022	Pengcheng Dai	"For experiments determining spin and charge correlations in high temperature superconductors using x-ray and neutron scattering."

== See also ==
- List of physics awards
