= Zhang Rujing =

Taiwanese electrical engineer (born 1948)

- 張汝京
- Born: 1948 (age 77–78); Nanjing, Republic of China
- Other name: Richard Chang Ru-gin
- Education: National Taiwan University (BS); University at Buffalo (MS); Southern Methodist University (PhD)
- Title: Founder, CEO, Semiconductor Manufacturing International Corporation (SMIC)
- Scientific career
- Fields: Electrical engineering
- Thesis: Finite element analysis of lateral current spreading in DH semiconductor injection lasers (1985)
Zhang Rujing
- Traditional Chinese: 張汝京
- Simplified Chinese: 张汝京
Transcriptions
Standard Mandarin
- Hanyu Pinyin: Zhāng Rǔjīng
- Wade–Giles: Chang¹ Ju³-ching¹

Zhang Rujing (Chinese: 張汝京; pinyin: Zhāng Rǔjīng; Wade–Giles: Chang¹ Ju³-ching¹; born 1948), alternatively known as Richard Chang Ru-gin, is a Taiwanese business executive and electrical engineer who is the founder of Semiconductor Manufacturing International Corporation (SMIC), the largest contract chip manufacturer in China. He is known as "the father of China's foundry industry" and China's "godfather of semiconductors".

== Early life and education ==
Zhang was born in 1948 in Nanjing, Jiangsu (then in the Republic of China), to a steelworker, Zhang Xilun, and his wife, Liu Peijin. When he was less than a year old, Zhang and his family fled on a boat to Taiwan during the Great Retreat. They arrived in Kaohsiung on the southern coast of Taiwan in 1949.

Zhang grew up in Kaohsiung. He graduated from National Taiwan University with a bachelor's degree in mechanical engineering in 1970, then completed graduate studies in the United States. He earned a Master of Science (M.S.) in engineering from the University at Buffalo and his Ph.D. in electrical engineering from Southern Methodist University in 1985. His doctoral dissertation was titled, "Finite element analysis of lateral current spreading in DH semiconductor injection lasers".

== Career ==
In 1977, at 29 years old, Zhang began working at the semi-conductor giant Texas Instruments alongside experts in integrated circuits with his first boss, Nobel Prize in Physics laureate Jack Kilby. Starting as a design engineer, Zhang would then develop under the mentorship of Shao Zifan, and help establish large-scale microchip factories including four in Texas, and others in Italy, Japan, Singapore, and Taiwan. Zhang would bring his then retired parents to the United States from Taiwan. In 1996, leaders from a visiting delegation from the now-defunct Chinese Ministry of Electronics Industry approached Zhang in the United States and, noting China's twenty-year gap in semiconductor manufacture, encouraged Zhang to return to mainland China and help his birth nation establish their own chip fabrication industry. In 1997, after twenty years of work at Texas Instruments, Chang returned to China.

=== Establishment of SMIC ===
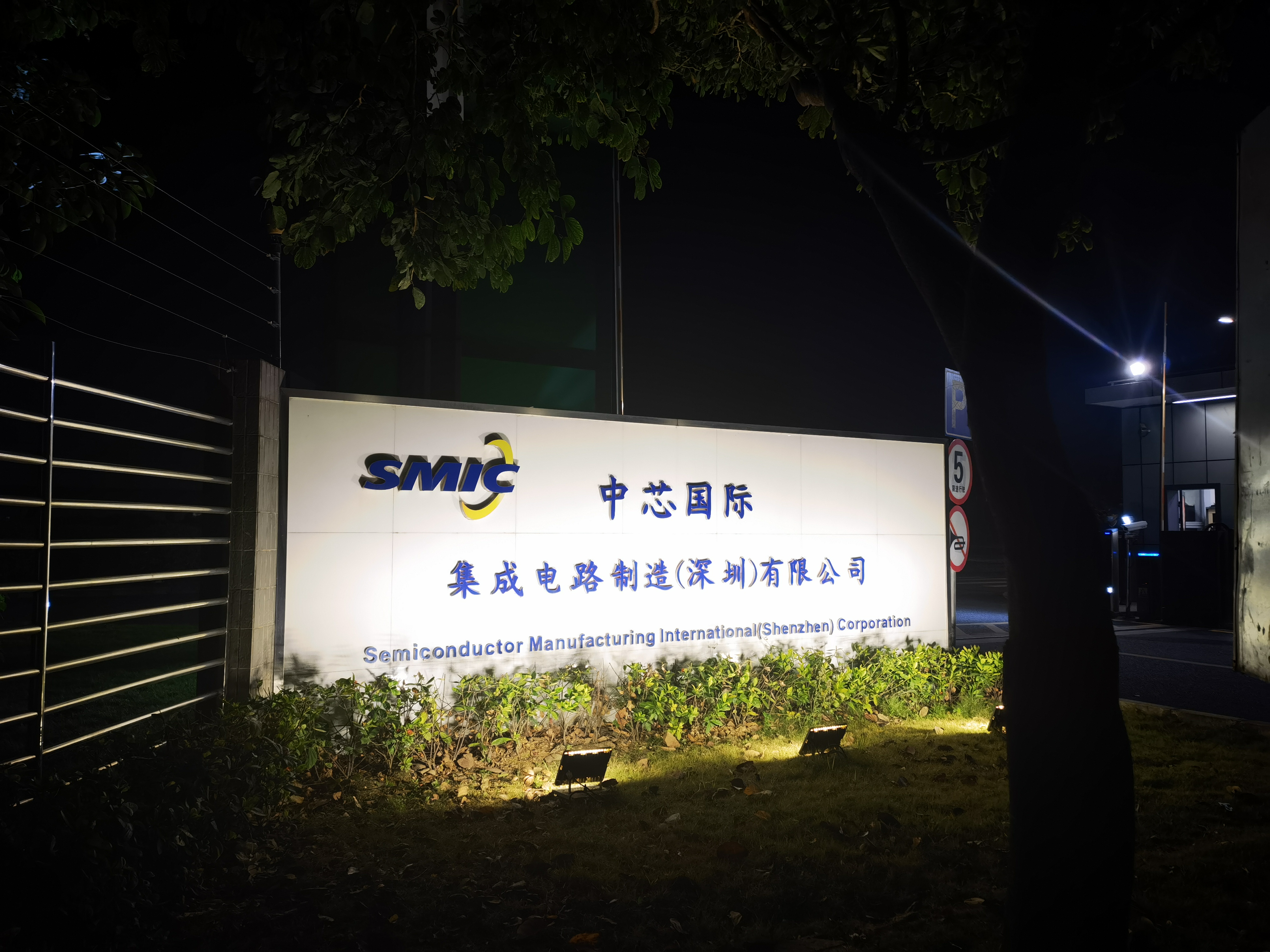
SMIC's Shenzhen Factory

Returning first to mainland China at age 50, Zhang began searching for locations for a Chinese semiconductor factory. He decided to travel back to Taiwan and founded Shida Semiconductor with the help of his contacts at Texas Instruments.

As TSMC expanded in Taiwan, its head, Zhang Zhongmou (Morris Chang), convinced TSMC shareholders in 2000 to acquire Shida Semiconductor for $5 billion USD. Zhang Zhongmou, reportedly appreciative of Zhang Rujing's talent and expertise, requested that Zhang Rujing continue to lead Shida Semiconductor, a deal Zhang Rujing accepted on the purported condition that a factory one day be built in mainland China.

Learning that Zhang Zhongmou did not intend to establish a factory in mainland China, in 2000, Zhang Rujing resigned, gave up his shares of TSMC, and travelled to the PRC capital of Beijing. Finding neither the city's mayor or vice mayor for science and technology who weren't in the city at that time, Zhang met with Deputy Directory of the Shanghai Economic Commission Jiang Shangzhou who brought Zhang south to Shanghai and introduced him to Zhangjiang Hi-Tech Park. That year, on 3 April 2000, Zhang founded the Semiconductor Manufacturing International Corporation (SMIC). The Shanghai fab was built exactly to Zhang's specifications, even including a church, as Zhang is a devout Christian.

By May, Zhang had recruited hundreds of engineers to Shanghai and construction of the plant began in August 2000. Zhang also moved both his mother (then over 90 years of age) and his American wife to mainland China. Zhang also reportedly built a 1,500 unit housing area for his employees and a bilingual K-12 school for children of employees.

=== Resignation ===
Already experienced in the establishment of semiconductor factories, Zhang continued to expand SMIC by building three 8 inch wafer factories in Shanghai, two 12 inch factories in Beijing, and purchased an 8 inch factory in Tianjin from Motorola.

In 2002, the Taiwanese government, allegedly feeling pressure from SMIC's primary competitor, TSMC, ordered Zhang to withdraw his investment. After Zhang's refusal, the government fined him 15 million Taiwanese dollars threatening to bring more fines should Zhang not desist.

In August 2003, as SMIC planned to launch an IPO in Hong Kong, TSMC sued SMIC in the United States courts for intellectual property theft and patent infringement.

In 2005, SMIC was ordered to pay US$175 million to TSMC in damages, surrender TSMC documents, and halt the use of TSMC technology and processes in SMIC's fabrication. Later, in a separate lawsuit, a California jury would find that SMIC breached the terms of the 2005 settlement by not returning documents and disclosing TSMC trade secrets in patent applications.

Along with a compensation of $200 million USD and 10% equity given by SMIC to TSMC in 2009, Zhang, then 61, was prohibited from operating in the chip industry for a period of three years.

== Later life ==
In 2014, having passed his three-year prohibition from the semiconductor industry, a 66-year-old Zhang founded Shanghai Xinsheng, the first 300 mm large silicon wafer company in mainland China. In 2018, Zhang established SiEn (Qingdao) Integrated Circuits which, in 2021, began producing 8 inch silicon wafers and was testing 12 inch production. Zhang has continued to play an active role in the advocacy of the People's Republic of China's chip industry. Zhang has expressed his confidence that China would catch up to global leaders in the industries of third-generation gallium nitride (GaN) and silicon carbide (SiC) semiconductors. SiEn, meanwhile, has discussed potential partnerships with Huawei Technologies to allow access to semiconductor development services in what the Japanese Financial Newspaper Nikkei asserts is an attempt "to plug holes in its semiconductor supply chain caused by the U.S. crackdown on the tech giant".
