= Morris Chang =

Taiwanese businessman and electrical engineer (born 1931)

- 張忠謀
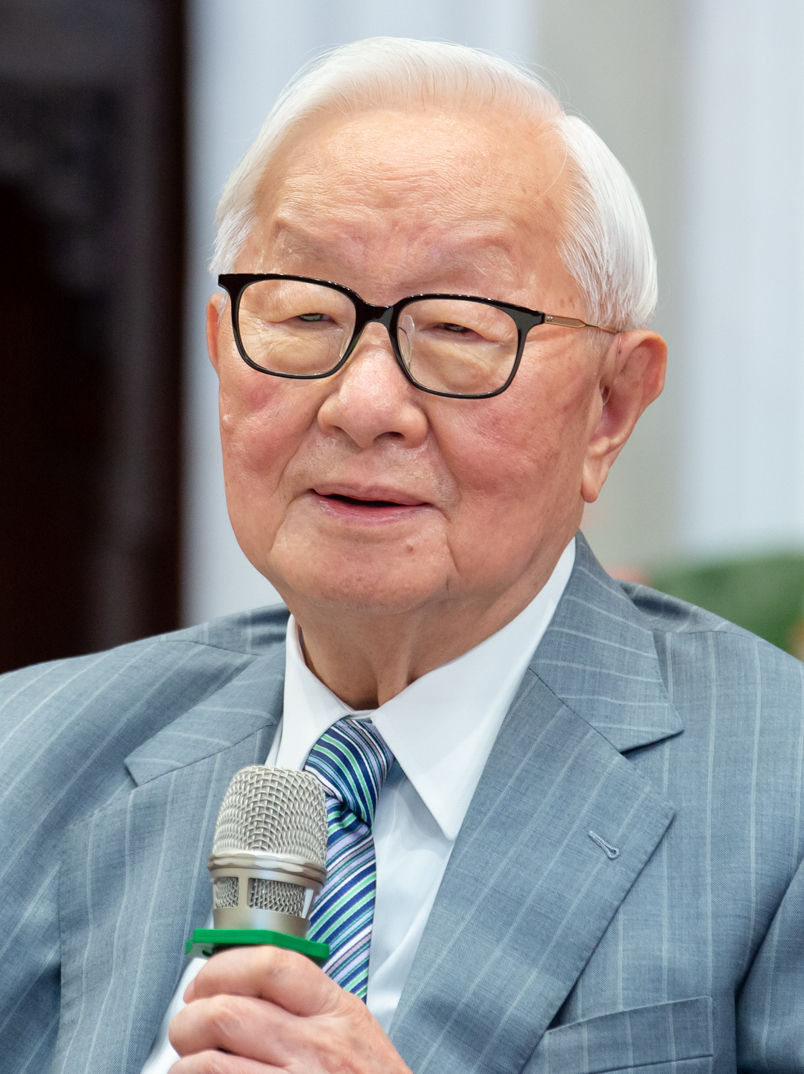
- Chang in 2020
- Born: Chang Chung-mou; 10 July 1931 (age 95); Ningbo, Chekiang, China
- Education: Harvard University; Massachusetts Institute of Technology (BS, MS, ME); Stanford University (PhD)
- Title: Founder and CEO of TSMC (1987–2005); Chairman of TSMC (1987–2018); President and COO of General Instrument (1984–1985)
- Spouses: Christine Chen (m. 1952; div. 1991) Sophie Chang (m. 2001)
- Awards: IEEE Robert N. Noyce Medal (2000); Nikkei Asia Prize (2005); IEEE Medal of Honor (2011); Order of Propitious Clouds (2018); Order of Dr. Sun Yat-sen (2024)
- Scientific career
- Fields: Electrical engineering
- Thesis: Optical absorption and photoluminescence of doped GaAs and (InxGa1-x)As (1964)
- Doctoral advisor: John L. Moll; William E. Spicer; Gerald Pearson

Chinese name
- Traditional Chinese: 張忠謀
- Simplified Chinese: 张忠谋
Transcriptions
Standard Mandarin
- Hanyu Pinyin: Zhāng Zhōngmóu
Yue: Cantonese
- Jyutping: Zeung^{1} Zung^{1}-mau^{4}
Southern Min
- Hokkien POJ: Tiuⁿ Tiong-bô͘

Morris Chang Chung-mou (Chinese: 張忠謀; pinyin: Zhāng Zhōngmóu; born July 10, 1931) is a Taiwanese electrical engineer and billionaire business executive. He is the founder of Taiwan Semiconductor Manufacturing Company (TSMC) and was the company's chief executive officer (CEO) from 1987 to 2005, and its chairman until 2018. As of April 2026, Forbes estimates his net worth at US$8.5 billion.

Born in China, Chang lived in Hong Kong and immigrated to the United States. After attending Harvard University, he graduated with three degrees from the Massachusetts Institute of Technology (MIT) and earned his doctorate from Stanford University in 1964. He began his career as a semiconductor engineer first at Sylvania Electric Products, then Texas Instruments, and, in 1984, became the president and chief operating officer of General Instrument.

During the 1980s, Chang moved to Taiwan to serve as head of the Industrial Technology Research Institute (ITRI). In 1987, he founded TSMC, the world's first semiconductor foundry, and is regarded as the founder of Taiwan's semiconductor industry. He pioneered the foundry model of semiconductor fabrication, leading TSMC to become the largest company in Taiwan and one of the world's largest semiconductor companies. President Tsai Ing-wen awarded him the Order of Propitious Clouds in 2018 and the Order of Dr. Sun Yat-sen in 2024 for his contributions to technology development in Taiwan.

== Early life ==
Chang was born in Ningbo, Chekiang, on July 10, 1931, to a middle-class Chinese family. His father, Chang Wei-kuan (1906–1992), was a graduate of East China Normal University (then Kwang Hua University) who received a Western education.

When he was young, Chang wanted to become a novelist or journalist, but his father persuaded him otherwise. Wei-kuan was an official in charge of finance for the Yin county government and later a bank manager. Due to the senior Chang's career and the outbreak of the Second Sino-Japanese War (1937–1945), the Chang family moved to Nanjing, then to Guangzhou, Hong Kong, Chongqing, and Shanghai.

Chang spent most of his primary school years in British Hong Kong between the ages of six and eleven. In 1941, due to the Japanese occupation of Hong Kong, Chang's family returned to Shanghai and Ningbo to live for a few months, eventually making their way to the wartime capital of Chongqing. In 1948, as China was in the height of the Chinese Civil War, Chang again moved to Hong Kong.

=== Education in the United States ===
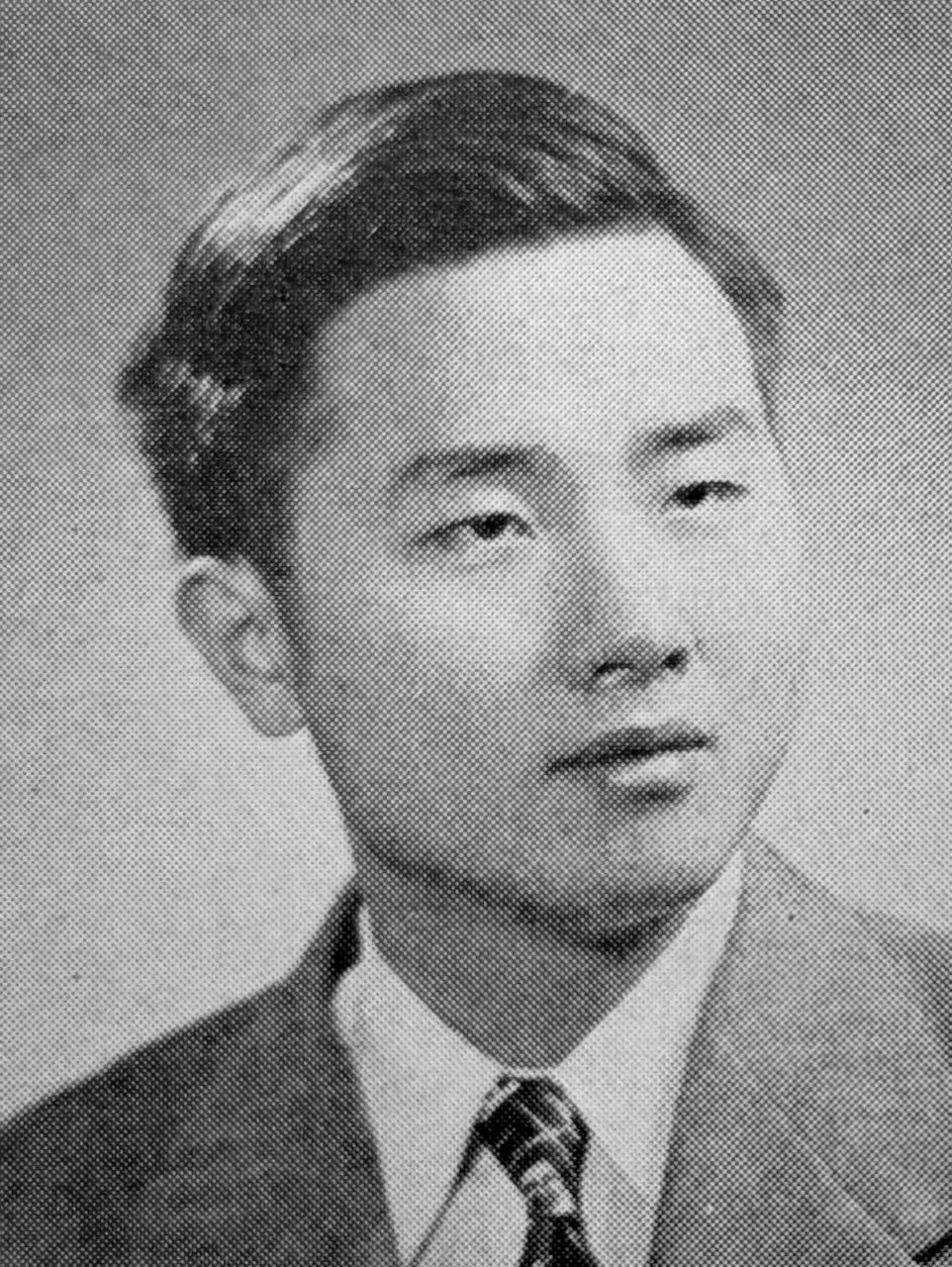
Chang as an MIT undergraduate, 1951

After high school, Chang decided to pursue engineering; because there were no universities dedicated to science or technology in Hong Kong, his father arranged for him to attend college in the United States. Chang Ssu‑hou (張思侯), Chang's uncle and a professor at Northeastern University, assisted him in applying to Harvard University, where he was admitted. In July 1949, Chang enrolled at Harvard College, where he was the only Chinese student out of its 1,100 undergraduates and placed in the top ten percent of the class his freshman year. He majored in applied physics and engineering sciences, but, in order to gain better career prospects in engineering, transferred to the Massachusetts Institute of Technology (MIT) in his sophomore year.

To defray tuition expenses, Chang won a scholarship at MIT and worked as a copy typist and research assistant under MIT professor Joseph Kaye. He took on the university's maximum course load and stayed during the summer to attend summer classes, finishing his undergraduate degree in two years instead of the expected three. He graduated from MIT with a Bachelor of Science in mechanical engineering in 1952, a Master of Science in 1953, and a Master of Engineering (M.E.) in 1955.

Chang did not pass two consecutive doctoral qualification examinations and eventually left MIT without obtaining a PhD. In 1955, he turned down a job offer from Ford Motor Company and joined Sylvania Semiconductor, then known as a small semiconductor division of Sylvania Electric Products. He was tasked with improving germanium transistor yields, besides device development. In 1958, he moved to Texas Instruments (TI), which was then rapidly rising in its field. After three years at TI, he rose to manager of the engineering section of the company. It was then, in 1961, that TI decided to invest in him by giving him the opportunity to obtain his PhD degree, which he received in electrical engineering from Stanford University in 1964 after only about two years of study. He earned his doctorate under John L. Moll, William E. Spicer, and Gerald Pearson. His dissertation was titled, "Optical absorption and photoluminescence of doped GaAs and (InxGa1-x)As".

== Career ==
Chang worked on a four-transistor project for TI where the manufacturing was done by IBM. This was one of the early semiconductor foundry relationships. Also at TI, Chang pioneered the then controversial idea of pricing semiconductors "ahead of the cost curve", which meant sacrificing early profits ("short term") to gain market share and achieve manufacturing yields that would result in greater profits over an extended timeline ("long-term").

During his 25-year career (1958–1983) at Texas Instruments, he rose up in the ranks to become the group vice president responsible for TI's worldwide semiconductor business. In the late 1970s, when TI's focus turned to calculators, digital watches and home computers, Chang felt like his career focused on semiconductors was at a dead end at TI.

Chang left TI and later became president and chief operating officer of General Instrument Corporation (1984–1985).

=== Taiwan ===
In the early 1980s, while still at Texas Instruments, Chang witnessed TI's factory in Japan achieving twice the chip production yield as TI's factory in Texas. Observing that the staff and technicians in Japan were better qualified and had lower turnover, and failing to recruit the same caliber of staff in the United States, he concluded that the future of advanced manufacturing appeared to be in Asia.

After he left General Instrument Corporation, Sun Yun-suan, Premier of the Republic of China (ROC), recruited him to become chairman and president of the Industrial Technology Research Institute (ITRI) in Taiwan, where the ROC government was now based, having lost the mainland. This marked his return to the ROC, initially thought to last for a few years, three decades after he left during the chaotic Chinese Civil War mainly between the People's Republic of China and the ROC.

As the head of a government-sponsored non-profit, he was in charge of promoting industrial and technological development in Taiwan. Chang founded TSMC in 1987 thanks to transfer of production technology and license of intellectual property from Philips in exchange for 27.6 percent equity and financing from the government's National Development Fund, Executive Yuan for 48.3 percent stake. This was the beginning of the period where firms increasingly saw value in outsourcing their manufacturing capabilities to Asia. Soon, TSMC became one of the world's most profitable chip makers. Chang left ITRI in 1994 and became chairman of Vanguard International Semiconductor Corporation from 1994 to 2003 while continuing as chairman of TSMC. In 2005, he handed TSMC's CEO position to Rick Tsai.

In June 2009, Chang returned to the position of TSMC's CEO once again. The same year, Chang performed the role of Master Dragon in the first episode of “Let’s Go Guang!”, an animated Chinese-learning program for children. In 2016, MIT named Building E52 the “Morris and Sophie Chang Building” in honor of Chang and his wife. Building E52 is the original home of the MIT Sloan School of Management and headquarters of the MIT Department of Economics.

On June 5, 2018, Chang announced his retirement from TSMC, succeeded by C.C. Wei as CEO and Mark Liu as chairman. Chang was awarded the Order of Propitious Clouds, First Class in September 2018.

Chang has served as Presidential Envoy of the Republic of China (Taiwan), under the name Chinese Taipei, to APEC several times. He represented Chen Shui-bian in 2006. Tsai Ing-wen appointed Chang to the same role six times from 2018 to 2023.

In an interview with the Brookings Institution in 2022, Chang said the US federal government’s efforts to increase onshore chip manufacturing by spending tens of billions of dollars would be a very expensive and wasteful exercise in futility. He believed the US would increase onshore semiconductor manufacturing somewhat at a very high cost, and produce at high unit costs, rendering it unable to compete with factories like TSMC. Chang said TSMC chairman Mark Liu decided to invest US$12 billion in Arizona at the urging of the US government.

== Personal life ==
Chang obtained American citizenship in 1962.

Chang met his first wife, Christine Chen, when he was at MIT and she was in Boston University. They married in 1952, when they were both 22 years old. They separated by the end of 1981 but did not divorce for the sake of their daughter, Chang Hsiao-lin, until 1991, shortly before she graduated from college. Chang married his second wife, Sophie Chang, a cousin of Foxconn founder Terry Guo, in 2001. He has two stepdaughters through his second marriage.

== Affiliations ==
- National Academy of Engineering (US)
- MIT Corporation, MIT's board of trustees, Life Member Emeritus
- Goldman Sachs member of board of directors (2001–2002)
- Advisor to the Office of the President of the Republic of China
- Committee of 100

== Honorary doctorates ==
- National Chengchi University, 2007
- Asia University, Taiwan, 2015

== Awards and recognitions ==
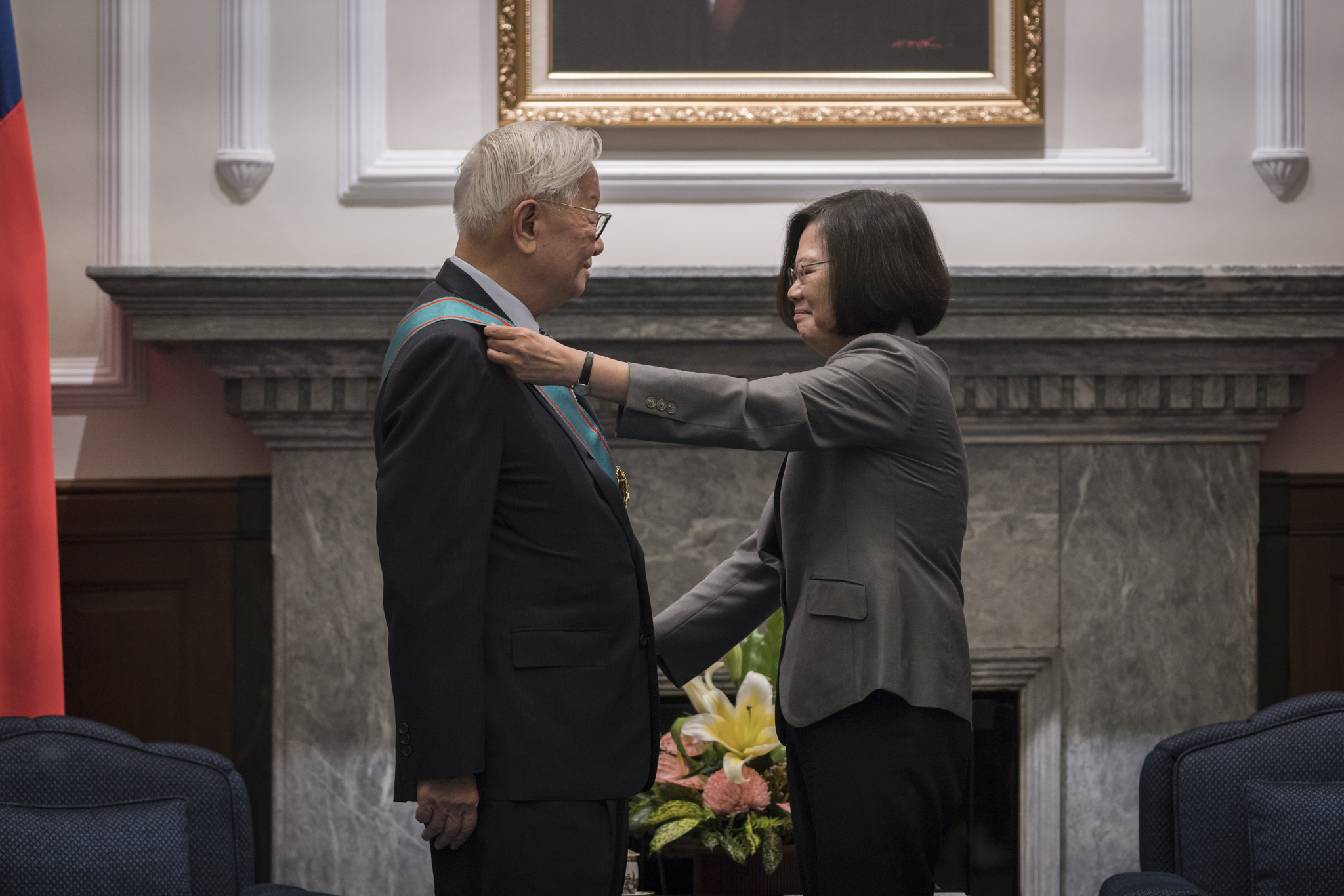
Morris Chang was conferred the Order of Propitious Clouds with Special Grand Cordon by President Tsai Ing-wen, 2018.

- 1999, Exemplary Leadership Award from the Fabless Semiconductor Association (now Global Semiconductor Alliance), the first recipient of the award; now the award bears his name, "Dr. Morris Chang Exemplary Leadership Award".
- 2000, IEEE Robert N. Noyce Medal for Exceptional Contributions to Microelectronics Industry.
- 2002 National Academy of Engineering Member
- 2005, Nikkei Asia Prize for Regional Growth
- 2007, Computer History Museum Fellow Award, for dramatically accelerating the production of semiconductor-based devices and systems by developing an independent semiconductor manufacturing foundry.
- 2008 Robert N. Noyce Award from the Semiconductor Industry Association (US)
- 2011, IEEE Medal of Honor.
- 2011, Order of Brilliant Star with Grand Cordon from the Republic of China.
- 2014 SPIE Visionary Award
- 2018, Order of Propitious Clouds with Special Grand Cordon from the Republic of China.
- 2024, Order of Dr Sun Yat-sen with Grand Cordon from the Republic of China.

== Authored books ==
- Chang, Morris (1998). 張忠謀自傳（上冊） 1931–1964 [Autobiography of Morris C.M. Chang Vol. 1 (1931–1964)] (in Chinese). Taiwan: Commonwealth Publishing. ISBN 9576214491.
- Chang, Morris (2024). 張忠謀自傳（下冊） 1964–2018 [Autobiography of Morris C.M. Chang Vol. 2 (1964–2018)] (in Chinese). Taiwan: Commonwealth Publishing. ISBN 9786263559752.

== See also ==
- Taiwanese Americans
