= George Crabtree =

American physicist (1944–2023)

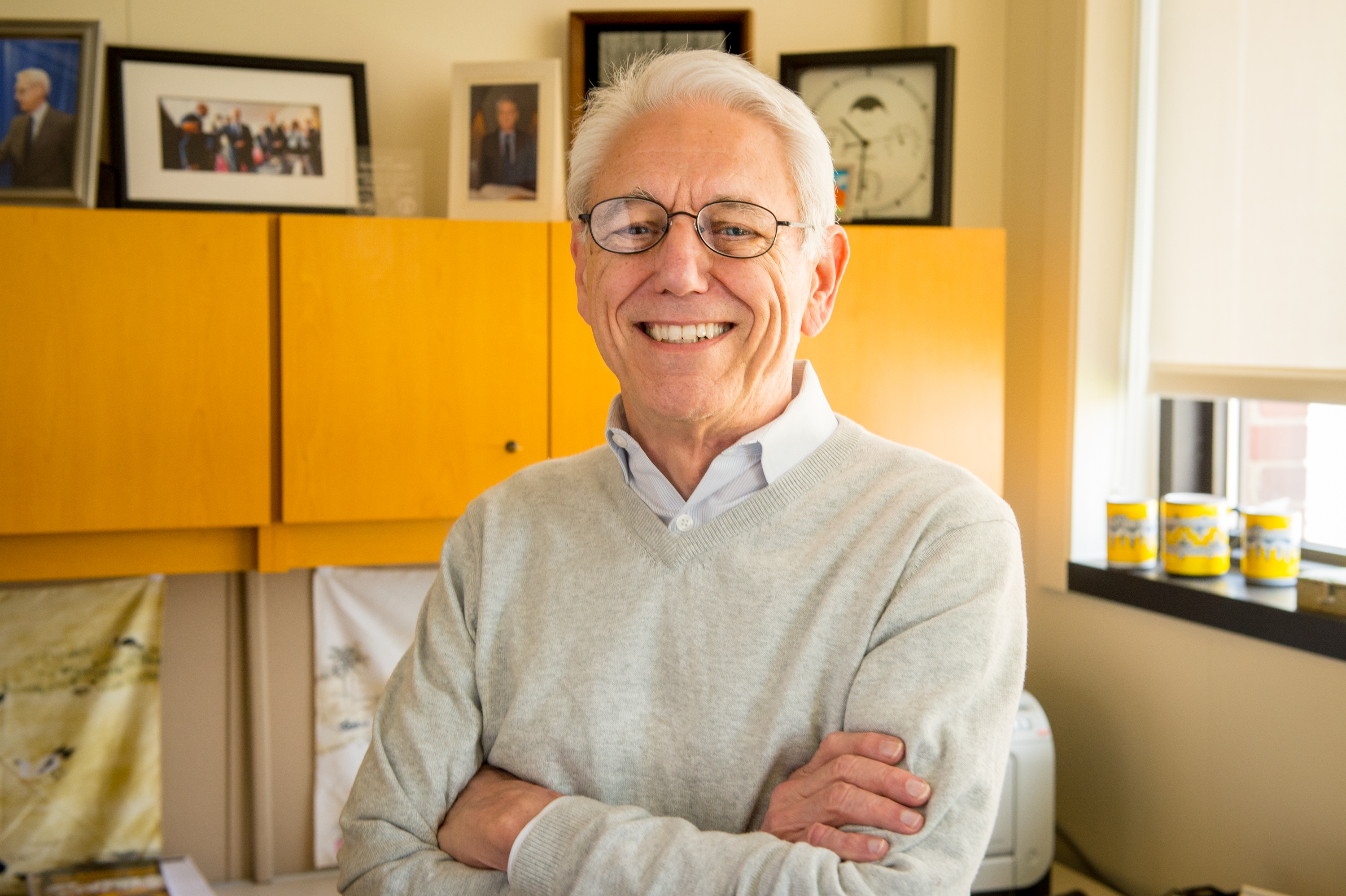
- Crabtree in 2013
- Born: George William Crabtree; November 28, 1944; Little Rock, Arkansas, U.S.
- Died: January 23, 2023 (aged 78); Chicago, Illinois, U.S.
- Occupation: Physicist
- Title: Director
- Website: JCESR

George William Crabtree (November 28, 1944 – January 23, 2023) was an American physicist known for his highly cited research on superconducting materials and, since 2012, for his directorship of the Joint Center for Energy Storage Research (JCESR) at Argonne National Laboratory.

== Early life and education ==
George Crabtree was born on November 28, 1944, in Little Rock, Arkansas, and moved with his family to Hillside, Illinois, at age 2. His father was a mechanical engineer for International Harvester, and his mother was a homemaker and community service volunteer.

Crabtree attended Proviso West High School in Hillside, Illinois, followed by Northwestern University, where he received a B.S. in science engineering in 1967. For graduate school, he first attended the University of Washington in Seattle, where he received an M.S. in physics in 1968, then the University of Illinois at Chicago, where he attained his Ph.D. in condensed matter physics in 1974.

== Career and research ==
Crabtree was the director of the Joint Center for Energy Storage Research (JCESR) at Argonne National Laboratory, and director of the UIC Energy Initiative and distinguished professor of physics, electrical, and mechanical engineering at University of Illinois at Chicago.

Most of Crabtree's long scientific career had been spent at Argonne National Laboratory, which he joined as an undergraduate in 1964 then staff assistant in 1969 and then, upon receiving his Ph.D., was promoted to assistant physicist in the materials science division in 1974. He was appointed an Argonne Distinguished Fellow in 1990. Subsequently, he assumed managerial roles for the Materials Science Division, where he served as associate director from 1993 to 2001, director from 2001 to 2008, and then associate director again from 2008 to 2012.

In addition to his work at Argonne, Crabtree was a professor of physics at Northern Illinois University from 1990 to 2003 and had been a professor of physics at the University of Illinois at Chicago since 2010. He also served on the Advisory Board of Zeta Energy.

=== Research ===
During his time in the Materials Science Division, Crabtree's central research focus was the electromagnetic properties of superconducting materials, in particular, their behavior in high magnetic fields. These fields are dominated by the presence and behavior of vortices, whirlpools of electrons circulating around tubes of magnetic flux. These vortices are of considerable practical significance since their statics and dynamics determine the maximum current that a given superconductor can carry without electrical resistance. Especially notable among Crabtree's publications on the topic are his studies of a new state of vortex matter, the vortex liquid, that appears only in high-temperature superconductors. Crabtree was an early pioneer of research in high-temperature superconducting materials, first discovered in 1986, including studies of their crystal structures, thermodynamic properties, behavior in magnetic fields, and maximum resistance-less current.

In a wide-ranging research career, Crabtree published more than 440 scientific papers on such topics as next-generation battery materials, sustainable energy, energy policy, materials science, nanoscale superconductors and magnets, and highly correlated electrons in metals. His most highly cited papers treat the hydrogen economy, solar energy, and high-temperature superconductivity.

=== Joint Center for Energy Storage Research (JCESR) ===
In 2012, Crabtree was appointed the Director of Argonne's newly formed Joint Center for Energy Storage Research (JCESR). Under his leadership, the center's researchers have reported advances in four types of next-generation batteries beyond current lithium-ion technology:

- Multivalent batteries using multiply-charged ions, such as doubly charged magnesium, calcium, or zinc, rather than a singly charged lithium ion
- Flow batteries that introduce chains of redox-active molecules dissolved in liquid electrolytes as replacements for solid electrodes
- Lithium-sulfur batteries based on strong chemical bonds between lithium and low-cost sulfur
- A novel hybrid design for a flow battery with air-breathing cathode and aqueous sulfur anode that has the lowest-cost rechargeable battery chemistry yet known

In 2018, Crabtree's Scientific and Operational Leadership team in JCESR received the Secretary of Energy's Achievement Award from the Department of Energy for "changing the formula for developing next-generation batteries."

=== Awards and recognition ===
Crabtree was a Fellow of the American Physical Society, a member of the U.S. National Academy of Sciences, and a Fellow of the American Academy of Arts and Sciences. In 2003, Crabtree was awarded the Kamerlingh Onnes Prize (granted once every three years) for his experimental research with others on vortices in high-temperature superconductors. Crabtree received the University of Chicago Award for Distinguished Performance at Argonne twice, and the Department of Energy's Award for Outstanding Scientific Accomplishment in Solid State Physics four times. He received an R&D 100 Award for his pioneering development of a Magnetic Flux Imaging System. He was also a charter member of ISI's Highly Cited Researchers in Physics.

Crabtree was an expert witness for the US Senate Committee on Energy and Natural Resources Hearing to Examine Expanded Deployment of Grid-Scale Energy Storage in 2019.
