= Bernhard Keimer =

German physicist (born 1964)

Bernhard Keimer (born 24 August 1964 in Ratingen) is a German physicist and Director at the Max Planck Institute for Solid State Research. His research group uses spectroscopic methods to explore quantum many-body phenomena in correlated-electron materials and metal-oxide heterostructures.

== Life ==
Keimer obtained his physics education at the Technical University of Munich and at the Massachusetts Institute of Technology, where he received his Ph.D. degree in 1991. He spent a year as postdoctoral associate at Massachusetts Institute of Technology and seven years on the faculty of Princeton University, where he was appointed Full Professor in 1997. In 1998 he was appointed Scientific Member of the Max Planck Society and Director at the Max Planck Institute for Solid State Research. In 2000 he was named Honorary Professor at the University of Stuttgart. He serves as Speaker of the International Max Planck Research School for Condensed Matter Science and Co-Director of the Max Planck Society – University of British Columbia Center for Quantum Materials.

== Awards ==
- 2025 Honorary Senator of the University of Stuttgart
- 2022 Heike Kamerlingh Onnes Prize
- 2011 Gottfried Wilhelm Leibniz Prize of the German Research Foundation
- 2010 Elected Fellow, Faculty of Engineering, University of Tokyo
- 2006 Elected Member, Heidelberg Academy of Sciences and Humanities
- 1996 Alfred P. Sloan Research Fellowship
- 1995 David & Lucile Packard Fellowship in Science and Engineering

== Publications ==
- Hinkov, V.; Haug, D.; Fauque, B.; Bourges, P.; Sidis, Y.; et al. (2008-01-10). "Electronic Liquid Crystal State in the High-Temperature Superconductor YBa_{2}Cu_{3}O_{6.45}". Science. 319 (5863): 597–600. arXiv:0807.1861. doi:10.1126/science.1152309. ISSN 0036-8075. PMID 18187621. S2CID 13241391.
- Dahm, T.; Hinkov, V.; Borisenko, S. V.; Kordyuk, A. A.; Zabolotnyy, V. B.; Fink, J.; Büchner, B.; Scalapino, D. J.; Hanke, W.; Keimer, B. (2009-01-18). "Strength of the spin-fluctuation-mediated pairing interaction in a high-temperature superconductor". Nature Physics. 5 (3): 217–221. arXiv:0812.3860. Bibcode:2009NatPh...5..217D. doi:10.1038/nphys1180. ISSN 1745-2473. S2CID 10135322.
- Le Tacon, M.; Ghiringhelli, G.; Chaloupka, J.; Sala, M. Moretti; Hinkov, V.; et al. (2011-07-10). "Intense paramagnon excitations in a large family of high-temperature superconductors". Nature Physics. 7 (9): 725–730. arXiv:1106.2641. Bibcode:2011NatPh...7..725L. doi:10.1038/nphys2041. ISSN 1745-2473. S2CID 8992693.
- Bayrakci, S. P.; Tennant, D. A.; Leininger, Ph.; Keller, T.; Gibson, M. C. R.; Wilson, S. D.; Birgeneau, R. J.; Keimer, B. (2013-07-03). "Lifetimes of Antiferromagnetic Magnons in Two and Three Dimensions: Experiment, Theory, and Numerics". Physical Review Letters. 111 (1) 017204. American Physical Society (APS). arXiv:1302.4867. Bibcode:2013PhRvL.111a7204B. doi:10.1103/physrevlett.111.017204. ISSN 0031-9007. PMID 23863025. S2CID 18258528.
- Le Tacon, M.; Bosak, A.; Souliou, S. M.; Dellea, G.; Loew, T.; et al. (2014). "Inelastic X-ray scattering in YBa_{2}Cu_{3}O_{6.6} reveals giant phonon anomalies and elastic central peak due to charge-density-wave formation". Nature Physics. 10 (1): 52–58. arXiv:1307.1673. Bibcode:2014NatPh..10...52L. doi:10.1038/nphys2805. ISSN 1745-2473. S2CID 119107565.
- Chakhalian, J.; Freeland, J. W.; Habermeier, H.-U.; Cristiani, G.; Khaliullin, G.; van Veenendaal, M.; Keimer, B. (2007-11-16). "Orbital Reconstruction and Covalent Bonding at an Oxide Interface". Science. 318 (5853). American Association for the Advancement of Science (AAAS): 1114–1117. Bibcode:2007Sci...318.1114C. doi:10.1126/science.1149338. ISSN 0036-8075. PMID 17932255. S2CID 23019729.
- Benckiser, Eva; Haverkort, Maurits W.; Brück, Sebastian; Goering, Eberhard; Macke, Sebastian; et al. (2011-02-06). "Orbital reflectometry of oxide heterostructures". Nature Materials. 10 (3): 189–193. arXiv:1101.0238. Bibcode:2011NatMa..10..189B. doi:10.1038/nmat2958. ISSN 1476-1122. PMID 21297622. S2CID 5328592.
- Boris, A. V.; Matiks, Y.; Benckiser, E.; Frano, A.; Popovich, P.; et al. (2011-05-19). "Dimensionality Control of Electronic Phase Transitions in Nickel-Oxide Superlattices". Science. 332 (6032). American Association for the Advancement of Science (AAAS): 937–940. arXiv:1111.3819. Bibcode:2011Sci...332..937B. doi:10.1126/science.1202647. ISSN 0036-8075. PMID 21596986. S2CID 9362419.
- Driza, N.; Blanco-Canosa, S.; Bakr, M.; Soltan, S.; Khalid, M.; et al. (2012-07-15). "Long-range transfer of electron–phonon coupling in oxide superlattices". Nature Materials. 11 (8): 675–681. arXiv:1206.2330. Bibcode:2012NatMa..11..675D. doi:10.1038/nmat3378. ISSN 1476-1122. PMID 22797829. S2CID 39935561.
- Frano, A.; Schierle, E.; Haverkort, M. W.; Lu, Y.; Wu, M.; Blanco-Canosa, S.; Nwankwo, U.; Boris, A. V.; Wochner, P.; Cristiani, G.; Habermeier, H. U.; Logvenov, G.; Hinkov, V.; Benckiser, E.; Weschke, E.; Keimer, B. (2013-09-05). "Orbital Control of Noncollinear Magnetic Order in Nickel Oxide Heterostructures". Physical Review Letters. 111 (10) 106804. arXiv:1304.1469. Bibcode:2013PhRvL.111j6804F. doi:10.1103/physrevlett.111.106804. ISSN 0031-9007. PMID 25166693. S2CID 27988019.
