= Øystein Fischer =

Norwegian physicist

Øystein Fischer (born 9 March 1942 in Bergen, died 19 September 2013) was a Norwegian physicist and specialist in the field of superconductivity. He was a professor of the Faculty of Science of the University of Geneva. He was also the founder and director of the Swiss National Center of Competence in Research MaNEP (Materials with Novel Electronic Properties), dedicated to exploring materials of the future.

== Career ==
After having worked as a technical research assistant for the laboratory Nera A/S in Bergen, Norway, Fischer studied physics at the Swiss Federal Institute of Technology in Zurich. He joined the University of Geneva in 1967 and obtained his PhD in 1971. He was appointed assistant professor at the University of Geneva in the same year. In 1977 he became a full professor.

== Research ==
In 1975, he synthesized the first superconducting compounds containing a regular lattice of magnetic ions, a discovery opening up a decade of international research concerning the interaction between magnetism and superconductivity. This work was highlighted by his discovery in 1984 of superconductivity induced via magnetic field.

With his team, Fischer launched the first artificial superlattices of superconductor cuprates, the pioneering work of many developments in new areas of thin films and oxide interfaces.

From 1986, Fischer assigned a part of his team to work in scanning tunneling microscopy which allowed him to probe the fundamental properties of high temperature superconductors.

In 2001, he founded and became director of the NCCR (PRN) MaNEP dedicated to the study of materials with novel electronic properties.

Fischer initiated the Geneva Creativity Center whose purpose is to stimulate discussion between the academic and industrial sectors and to find innovative solutions for future technological challenges. Fischer was also the head of the project "Centre for astronomical, physical and mathematical sciences of Geneva".

Over the past 20 years, Fischer has focused his research on superconductors using scanning tunneling microscopy (STM) and scanning tunneling spectroscopy (STS).

== Awards and honours ==
Year	Award
1986-1987	Theodore H. Geballe Professor, Stanford University, USA
1990	Doctor Honoris Causa, University of Rennes, France
2005	Gunnar Randers Research Prize, Oslo, Norway
2005	Doctor Honoris Causa, Université de Neuchâtel
2008	Tage Erlander Professorship, Swedish research council, Sweden
2010	Membre d'honneur de la Société Suisse de Physique
2012	Kamerlingh Onnes Prize, Washington
