= Ingolf Lindau =

Swedish physicist

Evert Ingolf Lindau
- Born: 4 October 1942 (age 83); Växjö, Sweden
- Education: Chalmers University of Technology
- Scientific career
- Fields: Physics
- Workplaces: Lund University; Stanford University
- Notable students: Michael Duryea Williams

Evert Ingolf Lindau (born 4 October 1942) is a Swedish physicist and professor emeritus at Lund University and Stanford University and a member of the Royal Swedish Academy of Sciences.

== Biography ==
Lindau was awarded his PhD in 1971 at Chalmers University of Technology with his dissertation about photoemission and optical absorption studies of the band structure. After the dissertation, he began working at the Silicon Valley–based company Varian Associates in Palo Alto between 1971 and 1972 before he was employed at Stanford University in 1972. In 1973 he obtained the first X-ray photoemission spectra of the 4f levels of gold. In 1980 he became a professor at Stanford University for his research in electrical engineering and photonics. During his professorships he took a sabbatical at Lund University between 1988 and 1989, where he worked at MAX Lab to expand its research facility. After his sabbatical ended he return to Lund University to become a professor for his research in synchrotron light physics. In 1991, Lindau succeeded Bengt Forkman as director of the Max Lab. As a director, he was in charge of the creation of the second accelerator for synchrotron radiation research in MAX Lab.

His research has focused on studies of electronic properties of semiconductor surfaces and their boundary layers using synchrotron light. He has also contributed to the production and development of instruments used in synchrotron light systems, both at SLAC and at Stanford Synchrotron Radiation Lightsource. He was elected as a member of the Royal Swedish Academy of Sciences as the 1402th member.
