= Sophie Chang (philanthropist) =

Chairperson of the TSMC Charity Foundation (born 1944)

- 張淑芬
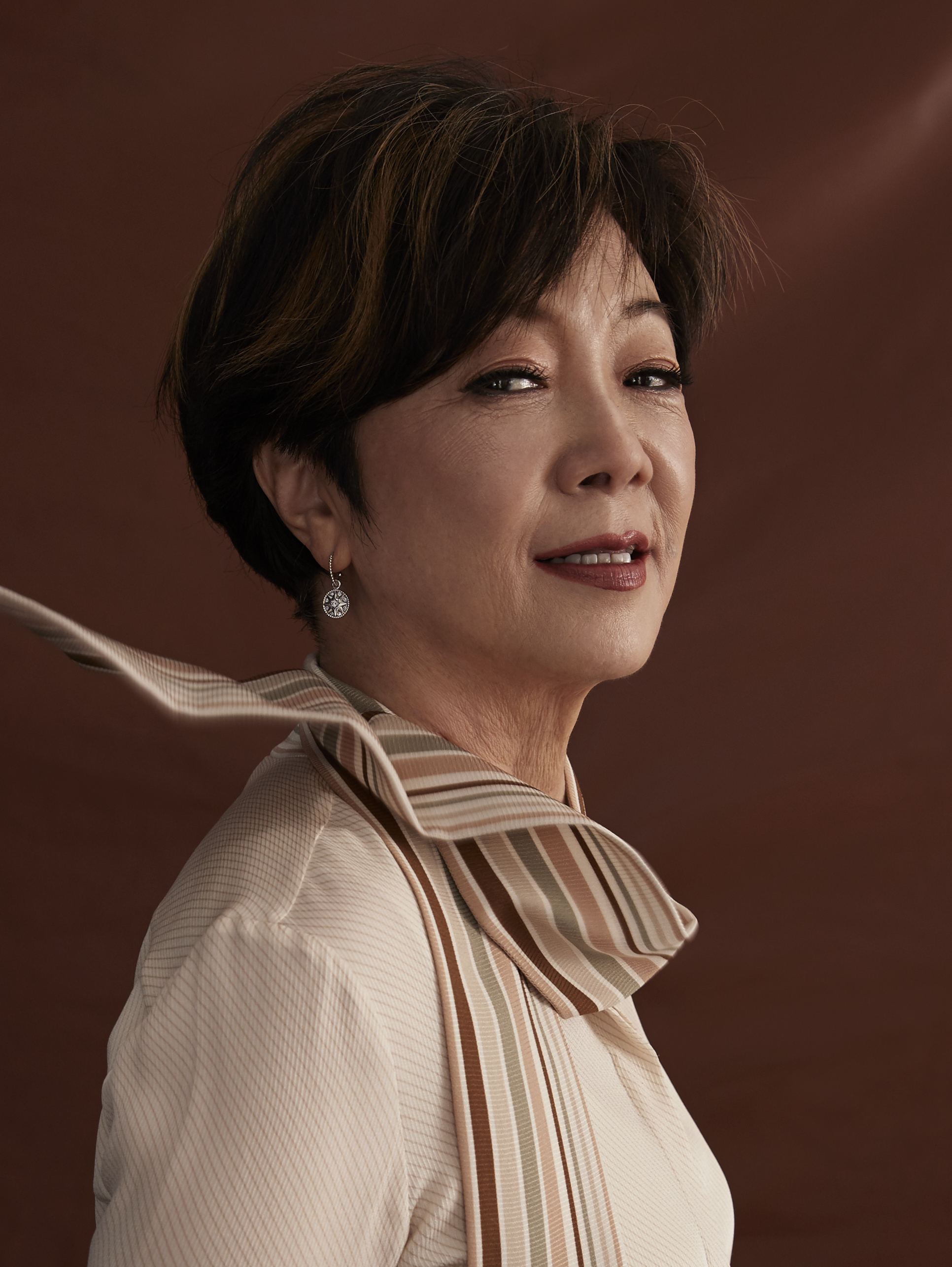
- Chang in 2022
- Born: 1944 (age 81–82)
- Occupations: Philanthropist; author; painter
- Known for: Chairwoman of TSMC Charity Foundation
- Spouse: Morris Chang
- Children: Karen Wu Audi, Vera Wu
- Relatives: Terry Gou (cousin)
- Awards: Taiwanese Ministry of Culture Cultural Association Medal (2021)

Sophie Chang (Chinese: 張淑芬; pinyin: Zhāng Shúfēn; born 1944) is a Taiwanese philanthropist, author and painter. She is the chairperson of the TSMC Charity Foundation and has participated in various non-profit initiatives in Taiwan.

== Philanthropy ==
Chang is the chairperson of the TSMC Charity Foundation, an organization that supports social welfare programs in Taiwan. She has served as president of the TSMC Volunteer Society since 2004, during which time she has coordinated disaster and emergency responses.

Chang has been involved with initiatives such as the "Sending Love" platform, which engages companies in corporate philanthropy. She also established the "Network of Compassion" platform, which includes over 7,000 volunteers, hospitals, and health services. The network has collaborated with government agencies on rural education programs in elementary and junior high schools.

Chang has supported the integration of filial piety education into school curricula through collaboration with local authorities and the Ministry of Education. She supported efforts to include the subject in the Ministry of Education's syllabus and created the National Filial Piety Education Workshop with the Ministry of Education's National Education Department and the National Filial Piety Resource Center, alongside the National Education Administration.

In 2019, she held the first National High School Filial Piety Education Microfilm Competition.

She has supported initiatives to expand access to technological and vocational education in rural areas. She has also collaborated with the After School Association of Taiwan on programs involving leadership training and skills development for students. Chang has worked with the Bayou Foundation to narrow the educational gap between students in urban and rural areas, with support from Lai Ching-te, the former mayor of Tainan City. In 2021, Chang launched a Technical Vocational Training initiative, partnering with Lifestyles of Health and Sustainability (LOHAS) and the Yunlin County Government to provide students from a remote township with the resources to grow and sell champignon mushrooms.

Chang was involved in disaster relief efforts in 2012, when she led TSMC in establishing a new tea plantation in the mountains of central Taiwan to help the indigenous people of Alishan rebuild their communities following Typhoon Morakot in 2009. In 2018, she visited Hualien County following a 6.0 magnitude earthquake and coordinated a company initiative that brought approximately 700 TSMC employees to the region as part of a tourism support campaign. Additional visits were later organized to further assist in local recovery efforts. In April 2021, Chang initiated a donation of 1,200 uniforms to firefighters who responded to the Taroko train derailment as part of an allocation by TSMC to help improve firefighters' equipment across the country.

In 2021 Chang organized a COVID-19 relief campaign through TSMC, which included support for hospitals in India and contactless testing stations throughout Taiwan. Later that year, TSMC jointly donated 15 million doses of the BioNTech (BNT) vaccine to Taiwan with Foxconn, the Yongling Foundation, and the Tzu Chi Foundation, with Sophie Chang representing the company upon the arrival of the first 930,000 doses.

That same year, Chang collaborated with Tainan Mayor Huang Wei-che, Taiyu Group Chairman Wu Yigui, and National Cheng Kung University President Huey-Jen Jenny Su to establish three solar power stations for the Ruifu Education Centre in Tainan. As part of a "green energy for public welfare" model, she also worked on installing power-saving LED lights in 32 schools in the rural township around Tainan to help reduce electricity costs for schools and support sustainability initiatives.

Chang is also a public speaker and delivered a speech at the 2020 International Women's Day Forum. In 2022, Chang was invited to join Caixin's ESG forum to discuss public welfare.

== Art and writings ==
Chang began her artistic career using traditional ink before transitioning to oil painting in 2019.

In 2020, she held her first solo exhibition, Boundless Love, at the Tainan Art Museum, which showcased fifteen works.

Her artwork has been included in charitable projects. In 2021, her designs were included in Shiatzy Chen’s Spring 2022 fashion line, with proceeds directed to non-profit organizations.

In addition to her visual art, Chang is the author of several published works, including Guide the Way, My Growth, and Progress on the Easel.

== Recognition ==
Chang was named one of the 50 most influential Asian philanthropists by Tatler Hong Kong in 2018, and received the 14th Compassion Award along with five other recipients in 2019.

In 2019, Tatler Asia listed Chang among the top five Taiwanese philanthropists.

In 2021, she was awarded the Cultural Association Medal by the Ministry of Culture of Taiwan.

== Personal life ==
Sophie Chang is married to TSMC founder Morris Chang and has one stepdaughter.

From a previous marriage, she has two daughters.

Her cousin is Foxconn founder Terry Gou.
