= Pengcheng Dai =

Chinese American experimental physicist

- Born: China
- Occupations: Experimental physicist, and academic

Academic background
- Education: B.S. in physics Ph.D. in experimental physics
- Alma mater: Zhengzhou University; University of Missouri, Columbia, Mo
- Thesis: (1993)

Academic work
- Institutions: Rice University

Pengcheng Dai is a Chinese American experimental physicist and academic. He is the Sam and Helen Worden Professor of Physics in the Department of Physics and Astronomy at Rice University.

Dai is most known for his research in the field of unconventional superconductivity and has contributed to comprehending the role of magnetic excitations in unconventional super conductors including copper, iron, and heavy fermion unconventional superconductors. He co-edited the book, Iron-based Superconductors: Materials, Properties and Mechanisms, and is the recipient of Heike Kamerlingh, Onnes Prize. He also made contributions to topological spin excitations in honeycomb/kagome lattice magnets and studied spin dynamics in colossal magnetoresistance manganites.

Dai is a Fellow of the American Physical Society (APS), American Association for the Advancement of Science (AAAS), and Neutron Scattering Society of America (NSSA) and holds an appointment as a Divisional Associate Editor at Physical Review Letters.

== Education ==
Dai received his baccalaureate degree in physics from Zhengzhou University in China. He then studied at the University of Missouri in Columbia, where he obtained his Ph.D. in experimental condensed matter physics. Later, he completed his post-doc at Oak Ridge National Laboratory (ORNL) working with Herbert A. Mook and became the staff scientist there.

== Career ==
After serving in the Center for Neutron Scattering at ORNL as a staff scientist, he resumed his academic career in 2001 and was appointed as an associate professor of physics at the University of Tennessee and ORNL as a Joint Faculty. He obtained his tenure in 2003 and was then promoted to professor in 2006. He became The Joint Institute for Advanced Materials Chair of Excellent at The University of Tennessee in 2008 and remained in that position until 2013 when he moved to Rice University. Having initially joined Rice University as a professor of physics, he now holds an appointment as the Sam and Helen Worden Professor of Physics there.

== Research ==
Dai's research primarily focuses on experimental condensed matter physics, using neutrons as a probe to study correlated electron materials. His works include direct evidence for magnetism and superconductivity coupling in unconventional superconductors, topological spin excitations in different classes of quantum materials and discoveries in the magnetic properties of cuprate and iron-based superconductors.

Dai established 'Pengcheng Dai's group' at Rice University's Physics Department, which conducts research on condensed matter physics and also founded a materials growth laboratory that produces high-quality single crystals of correlated electron materials.

=== Cuprate superconductors ===
In 1998, he demonstrated the incommensurate spin fluctuations in the YBa_{2}Cu_{3}O_{6+x} (YBCO) system, observed the resonance in underdoped YBCO and studied the effects of magnetic field on the resonance, and characterized the overall energy/wave vector dependence of the magnetic excitations in YBCO. Later, in 2000, he discovered one-dimensional nature of spin fluctuations. He has also worked on electron-doped cuprates. He clarified the microscopic origin of the annealing process, studied the electron-magnetic excitation coupling and discovered resonance in the electron-doped high-transition-temperature superconductor Pr_{0.88}LaCe_{0.12}CuO_{4−δ}.

=== Iron-based superconductors ===
Over the past 15 years, along with his research group, Dai has made contributions to describe the interplay between magnetism and superconductivity and has published more than 150 papers in the field. In 2008, they determined the antiferromagnetic structure in the parent compound of one class of iron-based superconductors. Afterwards, he mapped out the electronic phase diagram of these materials and carried out the first spin wave measurements to determine the effective Heisenberg Hamiltonian for the parent compounds of three families of iron-based superconductors. His research in 2014 led to the discovery of the first evidence for a spin nematic phase, accomplished by analyzing the evolution of overall spin excitations across the nematic phase transition temperature determined by transport measurements. His group also developed a cleaver detwinned device that allowed systematic measurements of magnetism in iron-based superconductors in the intrinsically detwinned state.

=== Fermion superconductors ===
In addition to cuprate and iron-based superconductors, Dai has worked on comprehending the interplay between magnetism and superconductivity in heavy fermion superconductors. This includes the discovery of upward dispersion in neutron resonance of CeCoIn5, mapping of overall spin excitations in CeCu_{2}Si_{2}, and antiferromagnetic spin fluctuations are coupled with superconductivity of spin-triplet candidate UTe_{2}. His discovery of an antiferromagnetic neutron spin resonance in spin-triplet superconductor candidate UTe_{2} is particularly important because it suggests that superconductivity in spin-triplet superconductors may also be driven by antiferromagnetic spin fluctuations instead of ferromagnetic spin fluctuations

== Awards and honors ==
- 2008 – Chair of Excellence, Joint Institute of Advanced Materials (JIAM)
- 2016 – Sustained Research Prize, Neutron Scattering Society of America (NSSA)
- 2022 – Onnes Prize, Heike Kamerlingh
- 2026 - Elected as a member of the American Academy of Arts and Sciences

== Bibliography ==
=== Books ===
- Iron-based Superconductors: Materials, Properties and Mechanisms (2012) ISBN 978-9814303224

=== Selected articles ===
- Dai, P., Mook, H. A., Hayden, S. M., Aeppli, G., Perring, T. G., Hunt, R. D., & Doğan, F. (1999). The magnetic excitation spectrum and thermodynamics of high-T c superconductors. Science, 284(5418), 1344–1347.
- Dai, P., Mook, H. A., Aeppli, G., Hayden, S. M., & Doğan, F. (2000). Resonance as a measure of pairing correlations in the high-T c superconductor YBa_{2}Cu_{3}O_{6. 6}. Nature, 406(6799), 965–968.
- Dai, P. (2015). Antiferromagnetic order and spin dynamics in iron-based superconductors. Reviews of Modern Physics, 87(3), 855.
- Chen, T., Chen, Y., Kreisel, A., Lu, X., Schneidewind, A., Qiu, Y., ... & Dai, P. (2019). Anisotropic spin fluctuations in detwinned FeSe. Nature materials, 18(7), 709–716.
- Duan, C., Baumbach, R. E., Podlesnyak, A., Deng, Y., Moir, C., Breindel, A. J., ... & Dai, P. (2021). Resonance from antiferromagnetic spin fluctuations for superconductivity in UTe_{2}. Nature, 600(7890), 636–640.
- Teng, X., Chen, L., Ye, F., Rosenberg, E., Liu, Z., Yin, J. X., ... & Dai, P. (2022). Discovery of charge density wave in a kagome lattice antiferromagnet. Nature, 609(7927), 490–495.
