= Rick Tsai =

Taiwanese businessman

- 蔡力行
- Born: April 19, 1951 (age 75)
- Education: National Taiwan University (BS); Cornell University (PhD)

Rick Tsai (Chinese: 蔡力行; pinyin: Caì Lìxing) is currently Vice Chairman and CEO of MediaTek (as of 1 June 2017) following his stint as Chairman of Chunghwa Telecom. From 1989 to 2014, Tsai worked at TSMC, where he was president and Chief Executive Officer from 2005 to 2009. Prior to being appointed CEO, Tsai served various roles, including chief operations officer, vice president of worldwide marketing and sales, and before that, two terms as executive vice president of operations. Between these two terms Tsai spent a short time away from TSMC, working as president of Vanguard International Semiconductor. From 1997 to 1999, Tsai served as executive vice president of operations, where he was responsible for six TSMC fabrication plants, as well as associated testing service and product assurance.

Tsai's work with TSMC began in 1989 and includes many distinguished roles: vice president responsible for operation of Fabs 3 and 4; senior director of Fab 3 responsible for design, construction, start-up, volume production and fab operation; and finally as director of Fab 2, Module A, responsible for operation, profit and loss, and process development.

Prior to joining TSMC, Tsai moved through the ranks during his 8 years at Hewlett-Packard in Fort Collins, Colorado, including R&D project manager, manufacturing engineering project manager, and as a member of the technical staff. His responsibilities at Hewlett-Packard included 1 um CMOS VLSI process integration, yield improvement, process development and process reliability.

Tsai received his Bachelor of Science in physics from National Taiwan University in Taipei, Taiwan, and holds a Ph.D. degree in material science and engineering from Cornell University in Ithaca, New York.
