= William E. Spicer =

American spectroscopy physicist (1929–2004)

William Edward Spicer
- Born: 7 September 1929
- Died: 6 June 2004 (aged 74)
- Education: College of William and Mary; Massachusetts Institute of Technology; University of Missouri
- Awards: Guggenheim Fellowship
- Scientific career
- Workplaces: Stanford University
- Doctoral students: Michael Duryea Williams

William Edward Spicer (September 7, 1929 – June 6, 2004) was an American engineering academic.

Born in Baton Rouge, Louisiana on September 7, 1929, Spicer enrolled at the College of William and Mary, earning his first bachelor's degree in physics in 1949, followed by an equivalent degree at the Massachusetts Institute of Technology in 1951. He then attended University of Missouri, completing master's and doctoral degrees in the same subject in 1953 and 1955, respectively. Spicer then worked for the Radio Corporation of America until 1962, when he joined the Stanford University faculty. Spicer received a Guggenheim fellowship in 1978, the same year he was appointed Stanford W. Ascherman Professor of Engineering. Spicer was granted emeritus status in 1992, and continued research work until his death of heart failure in London on June 6, 2004. Over the course of his career Spicer was elected a fellow of the American Physical Society and the IEEE, as well as member of the American Association for the Advancement of Science. He was a co-recipient of the APS Oliver E. Buckley Condensed Matter Prize in 1980, won the Medard W. Welch Award of the American Vacuum Society in 1984, followed by the Lifetime Mentor Award bestowed by AAAS in 2000.

After his death the Best Student Paper Award of the U.S. Workshop on the Physics and Chemistry of II-VI Materials was named for Spicer. Upon Thomas Noel Castleman's death in 2010, the award became known as the William E. Spicer - Thomas N. Casselman Award for Best Student Paper.
