= Silvia Picozzi =

Italian physicist

- Citizenship: Italian
- Education: University of L'Aquila; University of Camerino
- Scientific career
- Institutions: Consiglio Nazionale delle Ricerche

Silvia Picozzi is an Italian physicist who researches density functional theory, ferroelectricity, and antiferromagnetism at the Consiglio Nazionale delle Ricerche. She is an elected fellow of the American Physical Society.

== Early life and education ==
Silvia Picozzi received a bachelor's degree in physics from University of L'Aquila in 1994, and in 1998 she graduated with her PhD from the University of Camerino.

== Career ==
Silvia Picozzi works at the Consiglio Nazionale delle Ricerche, the National Research Council of Italy. She works in the Physical Sciences and Technologies of Matter department, where she is the director of research of SPIN (Superconducting and other Innovative Materials and Devices Institute) in Chieti, Italy. She is also part of the Nanoscience Foundries & Fine Analysis international project located in Trieste.

=== Selected publications ===
Some of Picozzi's most-cited works as of 2021 include:

- Picozzi, S.; Continenza, A.; Freeman, A. J. (2002). "Co2MnX(X=Si,Ge, Sn) Heusler compounds: Anab initiostudy of their structural, electronic, and magnetic properties at zero and elevated pressure". Physical Review B. 66 (9) 094421. Bibcode:2002PhRvB..66i4421P. doi:10.1103/PhysRevB.66.094421.
- Picozzi, S.; Continenza, A.; Freeman, A. J. (2004). "Role of structural defects on the half-metallic character ofCo2MnGeandCo2MnSi Heusler alloys". Physical Review B. 69 (9) 094423. Bibcode:2004PhRvB..69i4423P. doi:10.1103/PhysRevB.69.094423.
- Horiuchi, Sachio; Tokunaga, Yusuke; Giovannetti, Gianluca; Picozzi, Silvia; Itoh, Hirotake; Shimano, Ryo; Kumai, Reiji; Tokura, Yoshinori (2010). "Above-room-temperature ferroelectricity in a single-component molecular crystal". Nature. 463 (7282): 789–792. Bibcode:2010Natur.463..789H. doi:10.1038/nature08731. PMID 20148035. S2CID 205219520.

== Awards and honors ==
Silvia Picozzi was elected as a fellow of the American Physical Society in 2019. Her APS fellowship was in recognition of her "pioneering contributions to the fundamental understanding of microscopic mechanisms linking magnetic and electric dipolar degrees of freedom, through advanced modelling of ferroelectrics, antiferromagnets and multi-ferroics".
