= Aperture Hand Lab =

2019 video game

- Developer: Cloudhead Games
- Publisher: Valve
- Writers: Erik Wolpaw; Jay Pinkerton
- Series: Portal
- Platform: Windows
- Release: June 25, 2019
- Genre: Virtual reality
- Mode: Single-player

Aperture Hand Lab is a 2019 virtual reality (VR) game developed by Cloudhead Games and published by Valve. Set in the Portal universe, the player controls a character that has to complete several tests involving hand and finger gestures while being guided by personality cores. The game's plot was written by Erik Wolpaw and Jay Pinkerton.

The game was created to showcase the features of Valve Index VR headset, particularly the finger tracking technique. It was released for free on Steam on June 25, 2019. Reviewers commended the game's story and its demonstration of controls of the VR headset.

== Gameplay ==
The player has to complete tasks with hand and finger gestures.

Aperture Hand Lab is a simulation and virtual reality single-player game. Set in the Portal universe, the player has to complete several tests while being guided by artificial intelligence known as personality cores. These tests involve using hand and finger gestures to progress. The player will get different reactions and results depending on what gestures are used, such as devil horns and the middle finger. The game can be completed in approximately 15 minutes.

== Plot ==
The player works for Aperture Science, testing out robotic arms for unclear purposes. Various personality cores with different personalities, including Friendly Frank, assist in the process by instructing the player to perform various hand gestures. After each set is completed, the cores are dropped into the abyss. When the player is shaking hands with one of the cores, they accidentally rip the core's arm off, causing the whole program to malfunction and drop them both to the bottom of the facility.

At the bottom, the player again encounters Frank, who is resentful at having been abandoned. He holds the player at gunpoint and demands they free him but has a change of heart and discards the gun. The player is presented with the choice to either help Frank escape or destroy him. Regardless of their choice, the announcer declares that the experiment was for the purpose of testing the limits of friendship. He declares the experiment either a success or failure depending on the player's choice and places the cores in sleep mode as the test concludes. Frank nonetheless remains active, and the game ends with him and the player sitting in the bottom of the pit indefinitely.

== Development and release ==
Aperture Hand Lab was developed by Cloudhead Games and published by Valve. When Valve invited Cloudhead Games to attend their SteamVR reveal summit in late 2014, the company's staff decided that the use of roomscale was the best way to see VR's future. Since the summit, the studio has provided tech demos for every major SteamVR innovation. Aperture Hand Lab was developed to showcase the features and controls of Valve Index VR headset, particularly concentrating on finger tracking.

Valve provided the development studio with Portal materials, letting them use the assets as inspiration and a point of reference to make sure the right world-building atmosphere was created. After being shown the game's original plot and personality cores, Valve hired Erik Wolpaw and Jay Pinkerton to rewrite the story. Valve also contributed to the game with audio sounds and voice acting. Upon the announcement of Valve Index in April 2019, Valve shared snippets of Aperture Hand Lab to the public.

In addition to Valve Index, the game works with the HTC Vive and other headsets that are compatible with SteamVR. To play the game, however, Valve Index controllers are required. The game was released for free on June 25, 2019, on Steam for Windows platforms. A day after the game's release, the developer published an update that introduced support for Oculus Touch.

== Reception ==
Reviewers found Aperture Hand Lab to be pleasing. Writing for PC Gamer, Bo Moore described the game as having the appeal of prior Portal games, while Dan Stapleton of IGN found the story to be very funny. Jacob Ridley of PCGamesN praised the game's writing, while also describing the game as pleasant.

Additionally, reviewers highlighted the role of Valve Index features in the game. Ridley and Hayden Dingman of PC World found the game to be great for showcasing the features of Valve Index; Kris Graft of Gamasutra praised the "analog grip" of the controllers in the game. Moore, however, wrote that the finger tracking technique of Valve Index rather felt like a proof of concept than an innovative transformation of the gameplay. Andy Chalk of PC Gamer said that the HTC Vive compatibility feels like a futile endeavor considering that the headset does not support Valve Index controllers.
