= Weighted Companion Cube =

Item from the Portal video game series

- Portal element
- The Weighted Companion Cube in its original Portal incarnation
- Publisher: Valve Corporation
- First appearance: Portal (2007)
- Created by: Erik Wolpaw; Kim Swift; Scott Klintworth

In-universe information
- Type: Storage cube
- Traits and abilities: Dimensions in Portal: 2.5 feet (0.76 m); Dimensions in Portal 2: 2.25 feet (0.69 m)

The Weighted Companion Cube, or simply the Companion Cube, is an item featured in the Portal series of video games by Valve Corporation. Initially featured in a single level of the original Portal, Test Chamber 17, as one of Aperture Science's ubiquitous Weighted Storage Cubes with heart symbols printed on the outside, it is given to the game's main character, Chell, as part of the antagonist GLaDOS's sinister testing initiative. After carrying it through the entire level and ostensibly anthropomorphizing and "bonding" with the Cube, the malevolent AI forces her to unceremoniously dispose of it in an incinerator device. Companion Cubes later re-appear in the game's sequel with a slightly different design. The original Companion Cube is shown to have survived the events of both Portal and Portal 2, appearing as part of an ending gag.

While GLaDOS has suggested the Companion Cube may be sentient, it is unclear whether this was solely to psychologically torment Chell. In the comic Portal 2: Lab Rat, Doug Rattmann's Companion Cube is shown speaking to him, though this may be part of a schizophrenic hallucination.

Following the game's release, the Weighted Companion Cube quickly increased in popularity among fans, spawning a wide array of official merchandise and fan works. It has also been referenced in other, unrelated games as Easter eggs. Critics have remarked on the Companion Cube's significance as a storytelling device that highlights the dangers of blind obedience to authority, and players' attempts to subvert said authority by "saving" the Cube, even in the form of external fan works, have been widespread. Other interpretations have compared the Cube's disposal to animal testing and other experimental science, and the relationship between Chell and the Cube – a symbol of femininity – an example of queer romance.

== Conception and development ==
The Companion Cube was initially conceived as part of the gameplay of Test Chamber 17, due to players constantly forgetting to bring the crate along with them. Making the Weighted Companion Cube visually distinct and stating it as being so informed the player that it was of importance and was to be used and reused for the duration of the Test Chamber. The Cube was made to appear "vulnerable" rather than ubiquitous through GLaDOS's dialog, conditioning players to feel responsible for its well-being and want to take it along.

In early versions of the game, the player was forced to simply abandon it and move on. However, the developers were seeking a way to make the player familiar with how Aperture Science's incinerators worked in order to use them to destroy the personality cores in the final battle against GLaDOS. They hit upon the idea to have GLaDOS force Chell to destroy the Cube in the incinerator, believing the idea to be a "perfect thing" and "way stronger" emotionally, and attributing its success to "design arguments" between members of the development team.

== Appearances ==
The Companion Cube first appears in Portal's Test Chamber 17, where Chell is given it as a necessary tool to progress through the level. After being used to reach higher platforms, it must be taken with the player and used as a shield. The player must use the Companion Cube to activate three devices and jump across multiple platforms, before being forced to incinerate the Cube. The Cube returns at the end of Portal 2, where it is discharged from the facility by GLaDOS following Chell's egress, still bearing burn marks from its supposed incineration. Outside of the Portal series, the Companion Cube is featured in the Portal Escape Chamber DLC of Escape Simulator, which was officially approved by Valve Corporation. The Companion Cube is also present in the game Terraria as a pet.

In 2014, a Companion Cube icon was added to Geometry Dash along with the game being released on Steam, in 2015, the Companion Cube was featured in a Lego Dimensions Portal 2 pack, in 2017, a Companion Cube skin was added to Dota 2 for the character Io, and in 2020, the Steam version of Apex Legends added charms that included the Companion Cube being hugged by the character Wattson. Valve has also released merchandise of the cube, including a plushie and fuzzy dice in 2007. The Companion Cube was also featured as a piece of lost cargo in the 2019 game Death Stranding. In 2024, it would also appear as a purchasable prop in Sky: Children of the Light, in commemoration of the game releasing on Steam for Early Access.

== Critical reception ==
The Companion Cube serves as an example of experimental science's "sacrificial logic". Respawn: Gamers, Hackers, and Technogenic Life compares the fact that it must be "euthanized" for the sake of progress to real-world animal testing, especially because GLaDOS implies that it may or may not be sentient. GLaDOS claims that "an independent panel of ethicists" have absolved Aperture Science or its test subjects from "moral responsibility" for the death of the Companion Cube, but continues to obscure whether or not it can feel any pain, suggesting that only "eight out of ten" engineers agree that it "cannot feel much", much like the debate over pain in animals when used in scientific and medical research. Writing for Game Studies, Michael Burden and Sean Gouglas stated that Chell's obedience to GLaDOS resembled the Milgram experiment, with the Companion Cube test chamber most emphasizing blind obedience to authority under the mantle of science. They further noted that Doug Rattmann's scrawls warned Chell that she was the Companion Cube herself, a form of disposable tool utilized by the player to progress through the game.

The Companion Cube has also been shown to demonstrate how fans are willing to go outside the bounds of the game's logic in order to "rescue" the Cube, a form of resistance that is similar to hacktivism and culture jamming. Kim Swift, head designer of Portal, noted that many players were willing to do almost anything to save the Companion Cube, including jumping into the incinerator themselves. Others attempted to exploit or glitch the game in order to escape the test chamber with the Cube, such as jamming the doors with security cameras so that the player could leave the room despite not having incinerated it. This places players entirely into the role of Chell, with both player and Chell trying to escape a situation that is "algorithmically controlled" by GLaDOS. The desire to save the Cube also manifested in the many fan created works based on it, which "liberate" it from the game itself.

The Cube has been called an "object of desire", as it is purposely described by GLaDOS using the language of affection. While the relationship between the player and Cube appears to be platonic at first, the romantic and sexual implications are shown shortly after the player obtains the Cube as they can find a wall of graffiti depicting human figures with their heads replaced by Companion Cubes, including a nearly naked human-object hybrid pin-up wearing a red bra and matching underwear. The fact that the Cube is obviously depicted by Rattmann's graffiti in a feminine, sexualized way has led to interpretations of the relationship between Chell and the Cube, or between them and GLaDOS, as queer in nature, and evidence the game operates from a female rather than male perspective.

Matt Margini of Kill Screen compared the Companion Cube to other video game sidekicks that must be escorted through levels, calling it both an object of "annoyance" as well as "disproportionate emotional investment". Johnathan Neuls of Ars Technica praised the Companion Cube as "probably the strongest inside joke to come out of a game since 'All your base'".

World of Warcraft featured an Easter egg based on the Companion Cube outside of Stormwind, during the game's 2008 "Love is in the Air" Valentine's Day festivities. Fan Magnus Persson created a fully functioning Companion Cube PC, which Wired called "a triumph" in reference to "Still Alive". Another fan, Stephen Granade, turned a Rubik's Cube into a Companion Cube, albeit noting that it was "always solved".
