= Team Fortress Comics =

Webcomic by Valve Corporation based on the Team Fortress series

- Created by: Valve Corporation

Publication information
- Publisher: Dark Horse Comics (2009-2011)
- Genre: Action, Comedy

Creative team
- Writer(s): Jay Pinkerton; Erik Wolpaw
- Artist(s): Michael Avon Oeming; Heather Campbell; Maren Marmulla; Jim Murray
- Letterer(s): NassimO ("Death of a Salesbot" only)
- Colorist(s): Nick Filardi; Maren Marmulla; Saren Stone

The Team Fortress Comics, also known as TF comics, are a series of comedy-action webcomics published from 2013 to 2024 by Valve Corporation as a tie-in to the 2007 video game Team Fortress 2. After the release of several Team Fortress 2 comics starting in 2009 to promote major updates and events, Valve launched a standalone 7-issue comic series titled the Team Fortress Comics in 2013 under a dedicated team of writers and artists. The series concluded in 2024 after several internal delays. Where the Team Fortress games were designed as open-ended multiplayer shooters without a fixed storyline, the comics explore the player characters' lives after the events of the games, alongside an extensive fictional chronology focusing on the Mann family of business owners and an extremely powerful mineral called Australium. The series has been billed as "the most labyrinthine story in Valve history", and received praise for its narrative significance to the games and their fandom. The update comics were included in a 2011 Valve print collection.

== Background ==
Team Fortress originated with a Quake mod of the same name, which was later ported as a standalone GoldSrc title called Team Fortress Classic, featuring a realistic military aesthetic. Team Fortress 2 released in October 2007 with revamped, cartoonish visuals inspired by 20th Century popular art. The game is set in the 1960s during a fictional conflict called the Gravel Wars between mercenaries of two corporations called Reliable Excavation and Demolition (RED) and Builder's League United (BLU), supplied by a munitions company called Mann Co.. Players take the role of one of nine mercenary classes presided over by an unseen announcer named the Administrator and her underling, Miss Pauling. The Mann versus Machine game mode pits players against waves of computer-controlled robots, with live service rewards including extremely rare golden weapon reskins called Australium Weapons.

The Team Fortress 2 comics were part of a wider trend of webcomics expanding the universes of various Valve properties, published alongside Left 4 Dead: The Sacrifice and Portal: Lab Rat.

== Plot ==
An initial line of update comics introduced Redmond and Blutarch Mann as the rival CEOs behind the Gravel Wars, whose father, Zepheniah Mann, wrote them out of inheriting Mann Co. after they convinced him to spend a fortune on a series of useless gravel plots in New Mexico. The family's remaining wealth instead went to Zepheniah's maidservant, Elizabeth, while the company went to his Australian bodyguard, Barnabus Hale. The gravel plots were split between the brothers to ensure they would continue their senseless rivalry after Zepheniah's death.

The Administrator is characterized as a shadowy manipulator responsible for prolonging the Gravel Wars into the game's present day of the 1960s, with Redmond and Blutarch exploiting Australium, a gold-colored miracle metal and nuclear superfuel, to build and power life-extending machines to live well over a hundred years each. Australia itself is an advanced global superpower due to its discovery of the material, with a population obsessed with manliness and physical combat as a result of their exposure. Mann Co. is in turn inherited by Barnabus's grandson, globe-trotting adventurer Saxton Hale, who gladly provides weapons for both sides of the Gravel Wars.

The Mann vs Machine storyline introduces Gray Mann as the third Mann brother, who was abandoned at birth and raised by eagles before returning with the intent of world domination at the end of the Gravel Wars. Gray kills the senile Redmond and Blutarch before building a robot army to take over Mann Co., leading Hale to rehire the RED and BLU mercenaries for the ensuing Robot Wars.

The fictional history of the Team Fortress universe was compiled in the "Catch-Up Comic", which retroactively set Team Fortress Classic in the 1930s and 1940s, featuring an older, tactical "Team Classic" preceding the modern Team Fortress. Team Classic is in turn preceded by an 1800s team hired by BLU at the outset of the Gravel Wars, featuring Billy the Kid (Scout), Stonewall Jackson (Soldier), Abraham Lincoln (Pyro), Alfred Nobel (Demoman), John Henry (Heavy), Nikola Tesla (Engineer), Sigmund Freud (Medic), Davy Crockett (Sniper) and Fu Manchu (Spy).

Other comics promote the seasonal Scream Fortress and Smissmas events, the former introducing the character of Merasmus, a powerful wizard.

=== #1: "Ring of Fired" ===
Facing defeat in the Robot Wars, Gray invokes a clause Hale had written into the position of CEO, stipulating it could be obtained by anyone who bests him in single combat. Gray instead presents his secret eight-year-old daughter, Olivia Mann, as the challenger, forcing Hale to resign upon being unable to harm a small child. The two Manns try to access Mann Co.'s store of Australium to power Gray's own life-extending machine, only to find the Administrator had been using the conflict as cover to repossess it for her own ends.

Six months later, Miss Pauling sets out to recollect the mercenaries for a final job from the Administrator. She tracks down Soldier, Pyro, and Demoman after Soldier frames his former roommate Merasmus for the murder of Tom Jones.

=== #2: "Unhappy Returns" ===
Hale reunites with his ex-lover and former adventuring partner, Maggie (Mags), to defeat Gray. Demoman and Soldier rescue Scout and Spy from hanging for their mercenary activities in the town of Teufort, New Mexico. Pauling finds a birth certificate for Helen, the Administrator, at the Teufort library and destroys it.

=== #3: "A Cold Day in Hell" ===
Soldier, Scout, and Pyro track Heavy to the Dzhugdzhur Mountains in Siberia, where his family has been hiding from the authorities for years after escaping a gulag. Heavy's sister Zhanna falls in love with Soldier, and the family decides to end their exile to travel the world. Gray Mann hires the Team Fortress Classic mercenaries, led by the Classic Heavy and recently joined by the Team Fortress 2 Medic, to take down the Administrator.

=== #4: "Blood in the Water" ===
The team travels to Australia, which has been left in disarray by the recent loss of their natural Australium veins. Heavy and Scout run into Hale and Mags, Soldier, Zhanna, and Spy steal a submarine, and Pauling and Demoman track down Sniper. Pauling reveals to Sniper that he is one of the sole survivors of New Zealand, a Krypton-like lost civilization beneath the Pacific Ocean that is home to the last unclaimed Australium cache. The team travels there, only to find Sniper's irresponsible birth parents had squandered the entire cache with no knowledge of the material's power. Team Fortress Classic attacks, fatally shooting the Sniper and capturing the others.

=== #5: "Old Wounds" ===
The team is taken to Gray's private island for interrogation. The Classic Heavy turns on Gray, ripping the life-extending machine out of his spine and leaving him to die with the prisoners. Soldier and Zhanna break out and rescue Pauling, however not until after she is tricked into revealing the Administrator's location. Gray warns her the Administrator's plans for the Australium are likely far worse than his, but she dismisses this as he expires.

Medic revives the Sniper with science, explaining he only joined Team Classic for funding his experiments, and is reprimanded by the Classic Heavy after Sniper escapes. Classic Heavy reactivates Gray's robot army, including a new type of robot designed to siphon out the trace amounts of Australium found in Australian people's bloodstreams (alongside their blood itself).

=== #6: "The Naked and the Dead" ===
Demoman defeats the blood-sucking robots by inflicting them with alcohol poisoning, as his body has turned itself into a distillery and converted his blood to alcohol to fuel his addiction. Medic performs emergency blood transfusions on the other mercenaries. Heavy, Scout, Hale, and Mags parachute in with the team's weapons to fight off the other robots as the Classic mercenaries are picked off one by one. Spy admits to being Scout's father while disguised as Scout's idol, Tom Jones.

Classic Heavy kills Medic and uses Gray's life-extender to overpower the enraged modern Heavy in a fistfight. The Medic outsmarts the Devil in a deal, allowing him to return to life where he bluffs the Classic Heavy long enough for the life-extending machine to be ripped out of him. The Classic Heavy dies, but the machine's Australium charge is already used up.

The Administrator is revealed to have been using her own life-extending machine at the attendance of the Engineer. Learning the mission is a failure, she uses the last of her Australium in a single dose, reversing her age to that of a young woman but ensuring her death within the hour.

=== #7: "The Days Have Worn Away" ===
Helen is born sometime in 1800s America, and as a child witnesses the murder of her parents at Zepheniah Mann's behest. As an adult, she poses as a governess named Elizabeth, intending to kill Blutarch and Redmond, but finds Zepheniah in fact values fratricide above all else, with every Mann before him having murdered his siblings to attain the family fortune. As revenge, she instead engineers the rivalry between the boys to ensure a lifelong stalemate between the two, tormenting Zepheniah with the knowledge of their inadequacy until his death.

After the battle with Team Classic, Hale sets out to win Mann Co. back from Olivia and Pauling discovers a miraculous untapped vein of Australium at Soldier's hideout. She rushes a sample back to the Administrator's secret base only to discover her grand plan had only consisted of keeping a revived Zepheniah Mann alive, surrounding him with footage of the Gravel Wars to continue his torture. Helen had dismissed Zepheniah's "magic gravel" as a fool's gold, but was introduced to Australium's ressurective properties by a young Gray Mann, allowing her to revive Zepheniah and provide Blutarch and Redmond with their own life-extending machines to continue the Gravel Wars indefinitely. Realizing this, Pauling lies and says the Australium is gone. The Administrator admits she no longer remembers the cause of her vendetta, accepting her death as she and Zepheniah expire in one another's arms. Engineer offers to dispose of the cache, and Pauling accepts.

Seven years later, Hale and Olivia bond over a shared distaste for corporate life and agree to leave Mann Co. to be split between two rival underlings. Merasmus is broken out of prison by Soldier, but both are captured and Merasmus tortured to death by the South Korean mafia over a loan of ₩12,000 (US$17) Soldier had taken out in his name. Soldier is rescued by Heavy and Sniper, and reconciles with Merasmus's ghost. The team reunites at Scout's family home to wish the reader a merry Smissmas. Hale and Mags continue their adventures as seniors well into the present day.

== Development and publication ==
In 2009, Valve began developing Team Fortress 2 into what president Gabe Newell described as a "cross-media property". In August 2009, Valve brought aboard American comic writer Michael Avon Oeming to teach Valve "about what it means to have a character and do character development in a comic format, how you do storytelling".

The comics are divided into Update Comics, tying directly into the development of the game, and the standalone Team Fortress comics meant to remain independent of any updates. Update comics began with "Jarate Master", a short strip to promote the 2009 Sniper update, with "War!" as the first full comic released alongside the 2009 update of the same name. The 2010 comic "Loose Canon", accompanying the Engineer update, was the first to introduce a wider narrative to the fictional universe of the games, establishing what would become key elements of the Mann Versus Machine and Team Fortress storylines. The Update Comics continued until "The Showdown" to promote the 2016 "Meat vs. Match" event. The first two years' worth of comics were published by Dark Horse in Valve Presents: The Sacrifice and Other Steam-Powered Stories, a volume along with other comics created by Valve for Portal 2 and Left 4 Dead, and released in November 2011.

Team Fortress #1 was released on August 28, 2013, with the series originally planned for six issues on a bi-monthly or quarterly release schedule. A "Catch-Up Comic" was released on May 2, 2014, to bridge the update and standalone comic lines, onboarding new readers while tying Team Fortress Classic into the modern canon.

Team Fortress maintained a "regular" publishing schedule as late as issue #4, but entered an extended hiatus after issue #6, released January 10, 2017. The release of a seventh and final issue, described as the fans' "own white whale", was confirmed by multiple Team Fortress 2 developers in July 2024, coinciding with the community #FixTF2 movement and subsequent ban wave against in-game cheaters and bots. Valve writer Jay Pinkerton stated the issue had already been largely completed for some time and was only awaiting a greenlight for publication. Team Fortress #7 was released on December 20, 2024, just under eight years since the previous issue. The 330-page comic was illustrated by Heather Campbell and dedicated to the Soldier's late voice actor Rick May, who passed in 2020 during the hiatus between issues. The Team Fortress 2 blog, viewable in-game, released a post announcing the issue and lightheartedly apologizing for the delay. The hiatus is speculated to have been part of a larger "gaming hibernation" by Valve, with issue #7 releasing in the same period as the successes of Deadlock and the Steam Deck.

== Reception ==
Team Fortress has been lauded for its humor, presentation, and storytelling. The early issues were praised as "regularly excellent" and a welcome addition to the franchise. Issue #7 gained wide attention for its significance to Team Fortress 2 and its fans, receiving praise for its art and conclusion. A.D. Trinos critiqued the issue as representing a willingness to move on from Team Fortress 2's real-life legacy, with mentions of the team being replaced by newer, more technologically advanced teams across the United States mirroring the game itself being superseded by more modern hero shooters such as Overwatch, Valorant, or Apex Legends.

PC Gamer commented positively on the announcement of the Team Fortress Comics remaining independent of game updates, jokingly referring to Valve as "multi-media wizards (and occasional game developers)."

The comics have also spawned fan works by the community, some even receiving commentary from the original writers.
