= Wheatley (Portal) =

Fictional artificial intelligence in the Portal series

- Portal character
- Wheatley, as he appears in Portal 2
- First game: Portal 2 (2011)
- Last appearance: Lego Dimensions (2015)
- Created by: Erik Wolpaw
- Designed by: Michael Spinx; Jesse Brandt
- Voiced by: Stephen Merchant; Richard Lord (pre-release placeholder)

In-universe information
- Species: Personality Core

Wheatley is a fictional artificial intelligence from the Portal franchise, first introduced in the 2011 video game Portal 2. He is voiced by British comedian and writer Stephen Merchant, and created in part by Portal 2's designer Erik Wolpaw.

In the Portal narrative, Wheatley is one of several spherical "personality cores" developed to restrain GLaDOS, the main artificial intelligence that operates the Aperture Science facility, from becoming rampant, though Wheatley is later revealed to have been built to act as an "intelligence dampener" towards GLaDOS to hamper her capability for thought. Initially serving as a comedic foil and guide to the player-character Chell during the first half of Portal 2, Wheatley becomes the main antagonist of the second half as he takes GLaDOS's place and wreaks havoc on the facility before Chell and GLaDOS cooperate to stop him.

Since his appearance in Portal 2, Wheatley has received positive reception from critics. Merchant has been praised for his portrayal by critics who cited his fast-talking dialogue. Wheatley has also been described as a contrast to GLaDOS's "slower-speaking and more deliberate" personality.

== Appearances ==
The player-character Chell is introduced to Wheatley in Portal 2 when he revives her from her cryonic hibernation so they can both escape the deteriorating Aperture Science facility. Using a Portal Gun, Chell solves various puzzle tests until they accidentally revive the series' antagonist GLaDOS, who discards Wheatley while taking Chell to do tests. Wheatley eventually finds her and helps her escape, sabotaging GLaDOS' weaponry so they could defeat her. Chell initiates a core transfer, causing GLaDOS to be swapped with Wheatley, giving him control of the facility, which goes to his head, causing him to turn GLaDOS into a potato battery and send her and Chell into the facility's underbelly. He begins to change things, resulting in the facility falling apart. When they reencounter him, he forces them to do testing until he discovers robotic testing replacements, at which point he tries, unsuccessfully, to kill them. They eventually make their way to his lair, where they succeed in attaching corrupted cores to him to force a core transfer despite his efforts. He attempts to prevent this by boobytrapping a stalemate button, but Chell is able to remove him by putting a portal on the moon, causing him to be sucked out into space and letting GLaDOS retake the facility. After the credits, he is seen in space, expressing regret for his behavior.

Outside of the Portal series, Wheatley has appeared in several games in various capacities. An official plug-in created by Valve for The Elder Scrolls V: Skyrim features Wheatley floating around the Skills Menu. He also appears in Valve's multiplayer shooter Team Fortress 2 as an item, where actor Stephen Merchant reprises his role as Wheatley. In Rocket League, he appears as an antenna customization option for the player's car. He later appears as a non-playable character in Lego Dimensions, with Stephen Merchant once again reprising his role. In the main story campaign, he appears in Aperture Science and occasionally aids Batman, Gandalf and Wyldstyle in escaping and surviving GLaDOS's traps. In the bonus Portal-themed stage, Wheatley is now able to move and levitate under his own power; he is reunited with Chell and accompanies her through GLaDOS's new test chambers, expressing remorse for his previous actions and trying to ingratiate himself with Chell. He also appears in the Portal 2 adventure world, caring for a group of Frankenturrets and offering the player various sidequests. Voice-clips of Wheatley are used in the Portal pinball table released in Zen Pinball 2, Pinball FX2, and Pinball FX3.

=== Other appearances ===
For the 2011 Spike Video Game Awards nominations for Character of the Year, Wheatley appeared in a Source Filmmaker short made by Valve that was played during the event, in which Stephen Merchant reprised his role for a short time. An acceptance speech was also made had Wheatley won, but was not played at the event.

Wheatley also appeared as a laser-based engraving on a panel manufactured by NASA for the International Space Station, attached to the Kounotori 3 resupply craft.

== Concept and creation ==
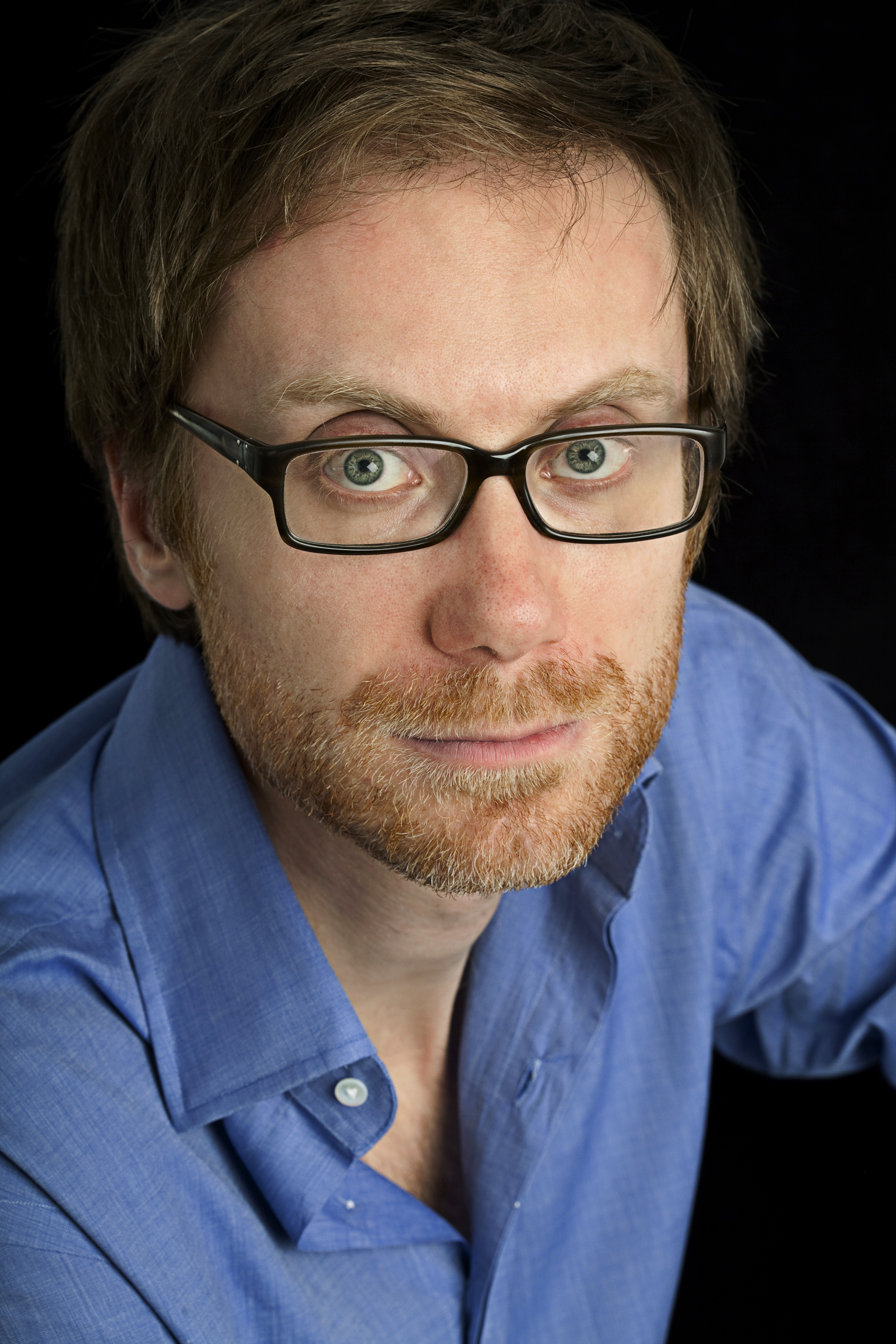
Stephen Merchant received significant praise for his portrayal of Wheatley.

Wheatley's role in the series was originally meant to be fulfilled by multiple different "personality cores" that the player would meet throughout the game. This was changed to be Wheatley, a single personality core, out of the belief that player never got to really learn about the multiple robots. Wheatley was designed with the purpose of making a character who "you’d be seeing a lot". Erik Wolpaw added that Wheatley served as an "offset" of GLaDOS; while her voice is "slower-speaking and more deliberate", Wheatley is a "frantic person", which Erik says is performed well by Merchant due to being able to relay information quickly in his speech. Wheatley is one of several personality cores created for GLaDOS; specifically, he was designed by the Aperture scientists as an "Intelligence Dampening Sphere" (or, as GLaDOS puts it, "the dumbest moron who ever lived") as a means to hamper GLaDOS's decision-making processes by injecting poor judgment into her routines.

Voice actor Stephen Merchant was chosen for the role both because the designers were fans of British comedy and because of Merchant's role in the television series Extras and his podcasts. Wheatley's characterisation was always designed with a British voice in mind. While they were writing Wheatley's dialogue, they had Merchant "in their heads" as a result of watching Extras, though at the time they did not consider pursuing him for the role because they did not think that they would be able to cast him. They were instead considering Richard Ayoade, up until they went to Merchant's agents.

Wheatley was designed with the intention of writing a video game character who spoke informally, which Wolpaw stated gave the sensation that the events were really happening, something players do not often see in video games. He also stated that sidekicks in video games have never "sounded as if they were just making things up as you go along". While they later discovered that Merchant was famous in the United Kingdom, they noted that he was not chosen for his fame. Wolpaw noted that Merchant was the most famous actor that they had featured in one of their games. While they wrote a script for Wheatley, Merchant had an "improvisational style" that they let him employ in the dialogue. Merchant also spoke some of the written dialogue in a way that seemed improvisational, such as in the "reading and repetition of words". This was one of the qualities that made them want to cast Merchant.

Merchant himself has compared Wheatley's personality to characters typically played by Woody Allen, and noted that while initially he did not know the gravitas of the role, the reaction by others made him take the role a lot more seriously. He described the recording sessions as "exhausting", so much so that by the end he was "not looking forward to it", but once the project wrapped, he was overwhelmed with the fan response and expressed interest in returning for a sequel.

Wheatley was designed, modelled, and rigged by Richard Lord. The character animation was done by Karen Prell. To achieve unique actions for each line of dialogue, this team created an extensive library of "reusable movement and acting components" such as squints, dilations, and emphatic plate flexing, which could be quickly composited. Wheatley's movements and timings were strongly influenced by Prell's experience in hand puppetry.

Original plans had Wheatley remain dead after being crushed by GLaDOS in the first chapter of the game, with her remaining as the main antagonist. The player would then meet six other spheres—including a paranoid sphere and a "Morgan Freeman sphere". This was changed, however, as the other spheres did not have enough time for the players to grow attached to them, and because playtesters missed Wheatley.

== Critical reception ==
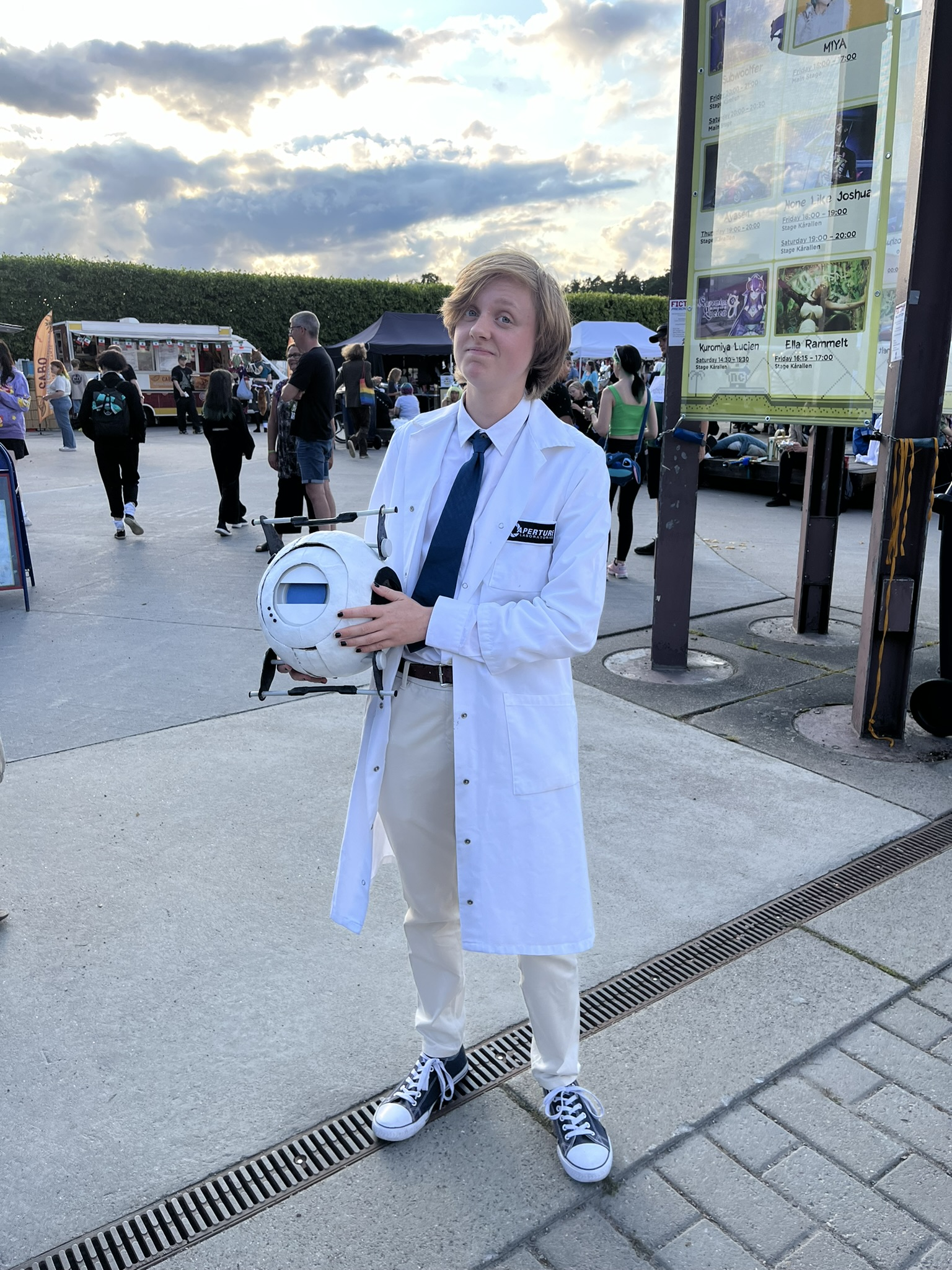
A cosplay interpretation of Wheatley

Stephen Merchant won two awards for his voice role as Wheatley: "Outstanding Achievement in Character Performance" at the 15th Annual Interactive Achievement Awards, and "Best Performance by a Human Male" at the 2011 Spike Video Game Awards. Wheatley earned a Spike TV nomination for 'Character of the Year'.

Edge staff wrote that Merchant's portrayal of Wheatley was "neurotically stuttering and blubbering" and that his "idiosyncratic staccato Bristolian burr" was a "fascinating choice". Edge staff also wrote that he served as Portal 2's "comic relief" and called him "alternately hapless and sinister, the mesmerizing animations of his 'eye light' and a changing role throughout make him an unforgettable presence". GameSpy's Will Tuttle wrote that Merchant's portrayal of Wheatley was "pitch perfect" and is "sure to be a fan favorite". The Telegraph's Tom Hoggins wrote that the "delightfully skittish" Wheatley's "casual, nervous patter reacting naturally to the events unfolding around you" was performed well by Merchant. He later wrote that the dialogue of Portal 2 was funny due in part to "the way that the frantic, nervous babble of Wheatley contrasts so effectively with the cynical, sinister goading from GLaDOS" and that neither are overbearing. The Guardian's Nick Cowen wrote that Wheatley was a "stammering, motor-mouthed droid" and at times "funny and monstrous and spine chilling". The Guardian's Will Freeman wrote that the "apparently sentient computers" in Portal 2 are "outstanding" though players may have a "divided opinion" on Wheatley.

An editor for The Province wrote that Merchant's portrayal of Wheatley "really adds to the personality and character of the game". Official Xbox Magazine's Jon Hicks praised the narrative of Portal 2 and cited Wheatley's "chirpy idiocy" as a contributing factor to its quality. OXM's Ryan McCaffrey wrote that Wheatley was "played to perfection" by Merchant. Computer and Video Games' Andy Robinson wrote that Wheatley's personality was "equally loud" to GLaDOS and "brilliant". GameZone's Ben PerLee wrote that Wheatley was "cute but stupid" and called him "adorable and bumbling, a lovable little guy who is much more involved than you might expect". The Escapist's Russ Pitts wrote that Wheatley was "a helpful – if dumb – robot companion with a chipper English accent". The Globe and Mail's Chad Sapieha wrote that Merchant was "enormously entertaining as a slow-witted sphere". Ars Technica's Ben Kuchera wrote that "the casting [of Merchant] was a brilliant choice". He also wrote that "there is something about his delivery that works wonderfully, and it seems like he was having a good time recording his lines". Kevin Wong of Complex included Wheatley to his "best supporting character in video games", and stated that "It's hard to get angry at, or form any kind of emotional connection to, something that has no face. Wheatley, however, makes up for his lack of humanity with dry, British repartee." Guinness World Records Gamer's Edition listed Wheatley as 37th in their list of "top 50 video game villains". TheGamer also included Wheatley on their "Iconic Video Game Characters", stating that "Wheatley is a fantastic villain, and his unique humor made him a fan-favorite character among the Portal fan base."

PC Gamer's Dan Stapleton praised Wheatley as "fantastically voiced" by Merchant and wrote that he was "basically playing the same mind-bogglingly stupid character from the Ricky Gervais comedy Extras". PC Gamer's Craig Pearson wrote that "his nervous English voice ... is another indicator that while Valve might not have known what they had with the original Portal, this time around they’re a lot more confident". Giant Bomb's Ryan Davis wrote that Merchant voiced Wheatley with "terrific nervous energy". Wired's Chris Kohler wrote that "you'll fall in love with Wheatley, a friendly robot with a heart of gold and the charming voice of actor Stephen Merchant". IGN's Charles Onyett wrote that it's "difficult to overstate how Merchant's obvious enthusiasm for the role benefits the game" and that "no word Wheatley speaks is without witty inflection, and the consistently clever writing perfectly complements the onscreen action". He also wrote that Merchant's Wheatley "steals the show" while GLaDOS and Cave Johnson's voice actors Ellen McLain and J. K. Simmons turn in solid performances. PALGN's Adam Ghiggino wrote that Merchant's performance was "brilliant" and that he has "a lot of emotion to [his] movement". Video Gamer's Jamin Smith expressed that Merchant's voice was 'familiar' and wrote that Wheatley "possesses more personality than the cast of most other games put together" despite "a lack of any distinguishing features at all" in its appearance.

GamesRadar's Tyler Wilde wrote that Wheatley was "surprisingly expressive" and called it "bumbling". PC Gamer's Lincoln Carpenter praised animator Karen Prell for achieving a seemingly impossible effect: "[bestowing] life to an orb." CNN's Larry Frum called Wheatley "silly, frantic and almost childlike". ABC News' Lou Kesten called it "equally memorable" to GLaDOS and a "chatty, nervous A.I." Entertainment Weekly's John Young described its eyeball's appearance as a "giant blue eyeball resembles a HAL 9000 computer with an Apple makeover". He also wrote that he was the "most delightful artificial-intelligence program one could hope to meet, and his witty quips and general clumsiness are a frequent source of amusement" and that he is "splendidly voiced" by Merchant. Editors for CNET wrote that "if Stephen Merchant doesn't win every video game voice actor award for his portrayal of the protagonist's wacky robot sidekick, there is no justice in either this world or any virtual one". An editor for CBS News wrote that Wheatley was "chirpy and well-intentioned" but also "dim-witted". The editor added that the "interactions between the player, GLaDOS and Wheatley are what give "Portal 2" its charm and provide much of the humor that keeps the game captivating puzzle after puzzle".

However, not all of Wheatley's reception has been positive; in an article by Ars Technica, Peter Bright stated that the character's role in Portal 2's plot was "predictable" and that "his tireless, relentlessly stupid schtick" got old quickly, with the character's jokes being "repetitive", further stating that Wheatley's "inane babble served only to disrupt the mood".
