= Chell (Portal) =

Fictional character in the Portal series

- Portal character
- Chell, as she appears in Portal 2
- First game: Portal (2007)
- Last appearance: Portal 2 (2011)
- Portrayed by: Alésia Glidewell (Lego Dimensions trailer)
- Motion capture: Alésia Glidewell

Chell (/tʃɛl/) is the silent protagonist in the Portal video game series developed by Valve. She appears in both Portal and Portal 2 as the main player character and as a supporting character in some other video games. Not much is known about Chell but some posit she is the daughter of an employee at Aperture Science Laboratories, the main setting of the games.

Chell's face- and body-model were derived from those of Alésia Glidewell, receiving a redesign in Portal 2. Chell is depicted entirely in first person in both games, though her model can be seen recursively through the titular portals. She has been well received for her role as a woman in video games, particularly not being overtly sexualized.

== Development and design ==
Valve's Erik Wolpaw felt that it did not really matter what kind of person Chell was, noting that playtesters of the first Portal often did not know her name as it was never mentioned. Wolpaw explained that they never mentioned her name as "[players] felt like they had this relationship with GLaDOS, and they wanted GLaDOS to recognize them". Chet Faliszek noted that Chell was the female version of Gordon Freeman's role as a silent protagonist (in the Half-Life video games). Wolpaw explained it served the game's humour better if she did not talk, characterizing her as a "straight man in a world gone mad" whose silence was necessary for the tone. GLaDOS only occasionally addresses this, asking "Are you even listening to me?" in Portal and describing her as a "dangerous, mute lunatic" in the sequel. Wolpaw has commented a few times that Chell simply will not give GLaDOS the satisfaction of a response, but he does not intend that theory to be taken seriously, instead he explains that having Chell talk would lead to a less interesting experience, due to her "straight man" characterization. In an interview by IGN about Portal 2: Lab Rat, Valve's Michael Avon Oeming commented that, currently, "Chell is more of a storytelling device," comparing her to the Spirit character by Will Eisner, but noted that more may be seen of Chell in the future.

The concept art for Chell

Chell's face and body model were derived from those of the director, producer and voice actress Alésia Glidewell. When making Portal 2, developers considered not bringing back the character. However, this was changed as playtesters wanted GLaDOS to recognize them as the person who had killed her in the first game. In her original redesign for Portal 2 developers tried to make her look appealing, yet not overdesigned, with nothing made simply for fashion. They explored changing her nationality, and tried to make her look less human due to the "constant dehumanization of these test subjects". Being a test subject, Chell's suit was designed to look neither sexy nor unattractive. The original redesign of the character featured a laboratory hat, which was thought of halfway through the concepting phase. Matt Charlesworth, Valve's concept artist, commented that the hat reminded him of test pilots.

This look was eventually abandoned in favor of returning to her original orange jumpsuit, this time with the sleeves tied around her waist. Valve's art team explained that this was to give her more freedom and help her stand out more as an individual.

== Appearances ==
In Portal, Chell is performing tests for Aperture Science, which are being overseen by GLaDOS, an artificially intelligent computer system. Chell destroys GLaDOS in her efforts to escape but is wounded, and an unseen figure called the Party Escort Bot drags her back inside.

In Portal 2: Lab Rat, a tie-in comic for Portal 2, Chell is put in stasis by Doug Rattmann after the events of Portal. He is revealed to be responsible for Chell taking part in the tests. Chell reappears in Portal 2 where she is reawakened by Wheatley. She and Wheatley attempt to escape the laboratory, and in the process accidentally reanimate GLaDOS. GLaDOS, furious with Chell for having "murdered" her, forces her to do more tests until Wheatley helps her escape. Chell and Wheatley work together to destroy GLaDOS's neurotoxin and turret production. GLaDOS eventually recaptures Chell, but fails to kill her due to her lack of neurotoxin and turrets. Chell takes advantage of the moment to replace GLaDOS's core with Wheatley's core. Wheatley, corrupted and driven to megalomania by inhabiting GLaDOS's former shell, betrays Chell and instead of freeing her, sends her to the very bottom of the Testing Facility. There she navigates several Mobility Gel testing areas that were in use between 1956 and 1985. As she ascends through level after level, she learns about the late founder of Aperture Science, Cave Johnson, and his assistant, Caroline, whose personality and intelligence were ultimately implanted in GLaDOS. Chell finds and picks up GLaDOS, whom Wheatley has placed in a small module powered by a potato battery. Opening the hatch that seals off the old facility from the new, Chell inadvertently pumps Mobility Gels up to the new facility, which later proves useful. Wheatley captures her and forces her to run tests for him until she finds his lair. And after attaching corrupted cores onto Wheatley, with the process of reverting being booby-trapped, she fires a portal to the moon which sucks her and Wheatley out into space. Chell is saved by GLaDOS, who lets her leave the facility via an elevator that takes her to the surface.

Chell's origin is unclear; GLaDOS claims that in Chell's file it states that she is adopted. In Portal 2, a long-abandoned science fair poster that was part of "Bring Your Daughter to Work Day" — the same day GLaDOS went rogue — is attributed to "Chell", implying that at least one of her parents worked for Aperture Science. The "Bring Your Daughter to Work Day" is also mentioned by GLaDOS in the first Portal game, saying "The Bring Your Daughter to Work Day is the best day to get her tested," implying Chell may have been taken on that same day. Some fans posit that Chell is the daughter of Cave Johnson, the founder and CEO of Aperture Science, though this is not proved in-game.

As both Portal games are presented in a first-person view, Chell is only seen fleetingly in normal gameplay, usually when portals are aligned in such a way that the player is able to create a recursive view of Chell. Placing two portals next to each other on a wall and then partially entering the one portal while facing the other allows the player a close-up view of Chell's face. Portal 2 replaces Chell with ATLAS and P-body in the multiplayer Cooperative Testing Initiative, and with a generic Aperture Science employee stick figure in the community workshop Perpetual Testing Initiative.

Chell is a playable character in the crossover game Lego Dimensions, and has access to her portal gun. Her character pack includes a sentry turret and a Companion Cube, and unlocks a bonus level in which she returns to Aperture and is reunited with Wheatley, with the two trying to stop GLaDOS once more. Additionally, a Portal-themed costume featuring Chell holding a portal gun is available in the 2020 battle royale game Fall Guys: Ultimate Knockout.

== Reception and legacy ==
GamesRadar+ writers Joe McNeilly and Charlie Barratt discussed how Portal presents her, both commenting that she was presented nonsexually, which Barratt argued was in contrast to the cliché of women being presented "half-naked" in games.

Kotaku's Luke Plunkett called Chell's original design in the first game memorable, later noting how in the first Portal "Chell [...] was never really the star of the game" as well as how little she was actually seen. Mike Fahey, also from Kotaku, defended Chell from people saying that she should talk, and said, "The last thing I would want in Portal 2 is for Chell to speak". When reviewing Portal 2, Game Informer's Adam Biessener said that much of what makes Portal and Portal 2 so special was the execution and the originality of standing in Chell's shoes and experiencing her destiny.

Chell was portrayed by Danielle Rayne in the live-action fan film Portal: No Escape.
