= Cave Johnson (Portal) =

Fictional character in the Portal series

- Portal character
- Johnson (left) and his assistant Caroline as they appear in Portal 2
- First game: Portal 2 (2011)
- Last appearance: Aperture Desk Job (2022)
- Created by: Erik Wolpaw
- Voiced by: J. K. Simmons

Cave Johnson is a fictional character from the Portal franchise first introduced in the 2011 video game Portal 2. He is voiced by American actor J. K. Simmons and created in part by Portal 2's designer Erik Wolpaw. He is referenced by a computer username in the first game and appears indirectly in Portal 2. Johnson serves as a guide to the player-character Chell as she explores an abandoned part of the Aperture Science facility, although canonically all of his messages are pre-recorded from before the events of the Portal games.

== Concept and creation ==
Cave Johnson was created by designer Erik Wolpaw and is voiced by J. K. Simmons. He is described as an "eccentric dead billionaire" and "extroverted, enthusiastic, and opinionated." He was the founder and CEO of Aperture Science. In the early days, the company was named Aperture Fixtures and made shower curtains for the military. It later became Aperture Science as Johnson's ambitions changed and grew. Early iterations of Portal 2 had a story which featured Cave Johnson as he gets put inside a computer, then coming to regret his decision. This idea, however, was eventually scrapped. They later envisioned Cave Johnson as the primary antagonist, but this was also scrapped. This idea was revealed as a result of leaked quotes from the character.

Johnson was envisioned since Portal as an "industrial, Southern guy" who would contrast with the "anti-septic" and "politically correct" nature of Aperture Science. Though the idea of the character underwent several changes over the development, the selection of J.K. Simmons helped solidify the character. Pictures of Cave Johnson appear throughout Portal 2, and though Valve used a casting call to try to find someone to use as a template, they turned back to their own lead animator, Bill Fletcher, for Cave's face.

Though comparisons have been made between Cave and the fictional character Andrew Ryan, the wealthy industrialist who created the fictional underwater city of Rapture in BioShock, Wolpaw claims they had not considered this character in their creation of Cave.

== Appearances ==
Cave Johnson's only full appearance to date is in the 2011 video game Portal 2, having been referenced in an Easter egg in the first Portal game in 2007. Johnson's voice actor, J.K. Simmons, spoke original lines for various trailers for Portal 2, including at the PAX East exposition in 2011.

Cave Johnson does not appear directly in Portal 2, but his image is seen in paintings and his voice is heard in pre-recorded messages as protagonist Chell traverses abandoned parts of the Aperture Science facility. These messages explain various areas, as well as the backstory of the company. In these pre-recorded messages, he is sometimes accompanied by his assistant, Caroline. Over time, both the company and his health begin to decline, the latter due to exposure to moon rocks. He later muses on the prospect of putting a person's mind inside of a computer, before saying that if he does not live until he can be uploaded, to put Caroline in charge of the facility as an AI, revealing that Caroline is GLaDOS. Alternative versions of Cave Johnson appears in the Portal 2 update, Perpetual Testing Initiative.

J.K. Simmons returned to the role for Lego Dimensions, and is able to be heard throughout the Portal 2 adventure world and bonus level. In his Lego Dimensions appearance, Cave Johnson has put his own consciousness in a Personality Core. He also portrays Cave Johnson in Dota 2, where Cave was added as an in-game guest announcer. In 2022, Simmons once again reprised his role as Cave Johnson for the Steam Deck tech demo Aperture Desk Job. The game takes place some years after Cave's body has died, but his personality has been implanted in a giant computer encased in a stone carving of his own head.

== Reception ==
Cave Johnson has received positive reception from critics, with J.K. Simmons praised for his portrayal. GameSpy's Will Tuttle wrote that it is "hard not to feel oddly honored to take part in some of the experiments that ranged across his entire career". He also wrote of Simmons that his voice "adeptly blend gravitas and silliness, and I found his segment to be just as great the second time I played through the game". ABC News' Lou Kesten wrote that Cave was a "memorable" character, and that Simmons helped in portraying what he thought was one of the three "most distinctive characters in video games" along with Wheatley and GLaDOS. Professor G. Christopher Williams discussed the relationship between Caroline and Cave Johnson, stating that it fulfilled the idea that "behind every good man is a good woman" due to his dependence on her for both the company and his comfort.

Alice Bell of Rock Paper Shotgun praised his portrayal in Aperture Desk Job, stating that in retrospect of all the character's actions, despite being written as "charismatic and funny, and kind of a caricature of a shouty 80s businessman, he's also obviously a gold plated dickhead". She enjoyed that the game portrayed him as weak, unable to endure a fate he considered for others, and how at the end of the game it was implied despite his desire to die his consciousness was kept alive by the results of his own experiments. She described it as being "hoist on his own petard, trapped in a hell of his own making that he asked for, is the perfect Greek underworld-style ironical punishment for Cave Johnson."
