= Alésia Glidewell =

American voice actress

- Born: Alésia Glidewell; Honolulu, Hawaii, U.S.
- Occupation: Voice actress
- Years active: 2003–present
- Website: https://aglidewell.com

Alésia Glidewell is an American voice actress. She is better known as the voice of Krystal in the Star Fox series, Alma Wade in the F.E.A.R series, Zero Suit Samus and Knuckle Joe in the Super Smash Bros series. Additionally, she provided the face and body models for Zoey in Left 4 Dead and Chell in the Portal series.

== Career ==
She has provided voices for video games, including Sly 2: Band of Thieves, where she plays Carmelita Fox and Constable Neyla; Star Fox: Assault and Super Smash Bros. Brawl, where she plays the role of Krystal, as well as playing Zero Suit Samus and Knuckle Joe. Alésia provided the voice and movements of the adult Alma Wade in F.E.A.R. 2: Project Origin and F.E.A.R. 3. In the credits of F.E.A.R. 2: Project Origin, she goes by the name Alicia Glidwell.

For the game series Portal, Glidewell provided the face and body model of the protagonist, Chell.

== Personal life ==
Glidewell was born in Honolulu, Hawaii to a Brazilian-American father and Japanese mother.

== Roles ==
Year	Title	Role	Notes
2004	Sly 2: Band of Thieves	Carmelita Fox, Constable Neyla, Clock-La	Voice
2005	Star Fox: Assault	Krystal	Voice
2005	The Matrix Online	—N/a	Motion capture for all female characters
2005	Mojo Master	Tutorial voice and female characters	Voice
2006	Left 4 Dead	Zoey	Voice, Face, and body model (later replaced)
2007	Portal	Chell	Face and body model
2008	Super Smash Bros. Brawl	Zero Suit Samus, Knuckle Joe, Krystal	Voice
2008	Condemned 2: Bloodshot	The Doll Woman	Voice
2009	F.E.A.R. 2: Project Origin	Alma Wade	Voice
2009	Demigod	Sedna	Voice
2011	F.E.A.R. 3	Alma Wade	Voice
2011	Portal 2	Chell	Face and body model
2014	Super Smash Bros. for Nintendo 3DS and Wii U	Zero Suit Samus, Knuckle Joe, Krystal	Voice (archive audio)
2015	Lego Dimensions	Chell	Live action only in Portal trailer
2018	Super Smash Bros. Ultimate	Zero Suit Samus, Knuckle Joe, Krystal	Voice (archive audio)
