= Half-Life: Alyx =

2020 video game

- Developer: Valve
- Publisher: Valve
- Writers: Jay Pinkerton; Sean Vanaman; Erik Wolpaw; Jake Rodkin
- Composer: Mike Morasky
- Series: Half-Life
- Engine: Source 2
- Platforms: Windows; Linux
- Release: Windows; March 23, 2020; Linux; May 15, 2020
- Genre: First-person shooter
- Mode: Single-player

Half-Life: Alyx is a 2020 virtual reality (VR) first-person shooter game developed and published by Valve. It was released for Windows on March 23, 2020, and for Linux on May 15, with support for most PC-compatible VR headsets. Players control Alyx Vance on a mission to seize a superweapon belonging to the alien Combine before the events of Half-Life 2 (2004). Like previous Half-Life games, Alyx incorporates combat, puzzles and exploration. Players use VR to interact with the environment and fight enemies, using "gravity gloves" to snatch objects from a distance, similarly to the gravity gun from Half-Life 2.

The previous Half-Life game, Episode Two, was released in 2007 and ended on a cliffhanger. Valve made several attempts to develop further Half-Life games, but could not settle on a direction. In the mid-2010s, Valve began experimenting with VR and identified demand for a major VR game. They experimented with prototypes using their various game series, such as Portal, and found that Half-Life best suited VR.

Alyx entered production using Valve's new Source 2 engine in 2016, with the largest team in Valve's history, including members of Campo Santo, a studio acquired by Valve in 2018. VR affected almost every aspect of the design, including level design, combat, movement and pacing. Valve planned to launch Alyx alongside its Index headset in 2019, but delayed it to rewrite the story following internal feedback.

Alyx received acclaim for its graphics, voice acting, narrative and atmosphere, and has been described as the first VR killer app. It was nominated for numerous awards and won "Best VR/AR" at the 2020 Game Awards. Valve acknowledged that the audience for VR games was limited, and Gabe Newell, Valve's president, described Alyx as a long-term investment into new technologies. As of 2024, it had sold more than two million copies. In 2026, Valve ported Alyx to its standalone Steam Frame headset.

== Gameplay ==
Screenshot showing the VR perspective hands and user interface

Half-Life Alyx is a first-person shooter played in virtual reality (VR). Players control the Resistance member Alyx Vance, who fights the Combine, an alien empire that has conquered Earth. Like previous Half-Life games, Alyx incorporates combat, puzzles, exploration and narrative. Players use VR to get supplies, use interfaces, throw objects and use weapons. Like the gravity gun from Half-Life 2, the gravity gloves allow players to pick up objects from a distance. By solving hacking puzzles, Alyx can interact with Combine technology.

Alyx includes elements of survival horror, with frightening encounters and scarce ammunition. In one chapter, players encounter Jeff, a blind monster attracted to sound, and must move quietly and throw objects to distract him. Alien spores in the area cause Alyx to cough, which players can prevent by holding their hands over their mouths.

Alyx supports all VR headsets compatible with SteamVR, including the Valve Index, HTC Vive, Oculus Rift, Meta Quest and all Windows Mixed Reality headsets. As the gameplay was designed for VR, Valve said they had no plans for a non-VR version. Alyx also supports user mods via the Steam Workshop.

== Plot ==
Earth has been conquered by the alien Combine, who have implemented a brutal police state. In City 17, Alyx Vance (Ozioma Akagha) and her father Eli (James Moses Black) are arrested by Combine forces as part of a crackdown on the Resistance. The Resistance member Russell (Rhys Darby), an inventor, rescues Alyx and warns her that the Combine are planning to transport Eli to Nova Prospekt for interrogation.

In the quarantine zone, an area of City 17 overrun with alien creatures, Alyx meets a vortigaunt named Gary (Tony Todd). He asks her to save his fellow vortigaunts and foresees that Eli will die. Alyx derails the train carrying Eli, who is rescued from the wreckage by Gary. While in custody, Eli learned that the Combine are storing a superweapon in a vault inside the quarantine zone. He instructs Alyx to find the vault and retrieve its contents.

Alyx fights past Combine forces and shuts down a power station keeping the vault aloft. She discovers that each station is powered by an enslaved vortigaunt. She rescues the station's vortigaunt, who promises that the vortigaunts will disable the remaining stations. Alyx moves through a distillery, where she escapes a hazardous waste worker, Jeff, who has succumbed to alien infection. Eli contacts Alyx and warns her that the vault is a prison built to contain something discovered by the Combine. Russell reasons that it holds Gordon Freeman, and Alyx crashes the vault to the ground. Instead of finding Freeman inside, she releases the G-Man.

As a reward for freeing him, the G-Man offers his services to Alyx. She demands the removal of the Combine from Earth, but the G-Man says this would not be in the interests of his "employers". He instead shows her a vision taking place five years in the future, and offers her the chance to change the outcome of Eli's death at the hands of a Combine Advisor at the White Forest rocket facility. Alyx complies, killing the Advisor and saving her father. The G-Man informs Alyx that she has proven herself capable of replacing Freeman, with whom he has grown dissatisfied. Despite Alyx's protests, he suspends her in stasis and leaves. Five years later, Freeman regains consciousness at White Forest and is reunited with Eli. Realizing that the G-Man has Alyx, Eli declares his intention to kill him and hands Freeman his crowbar.

== Development ==
=== Background ===
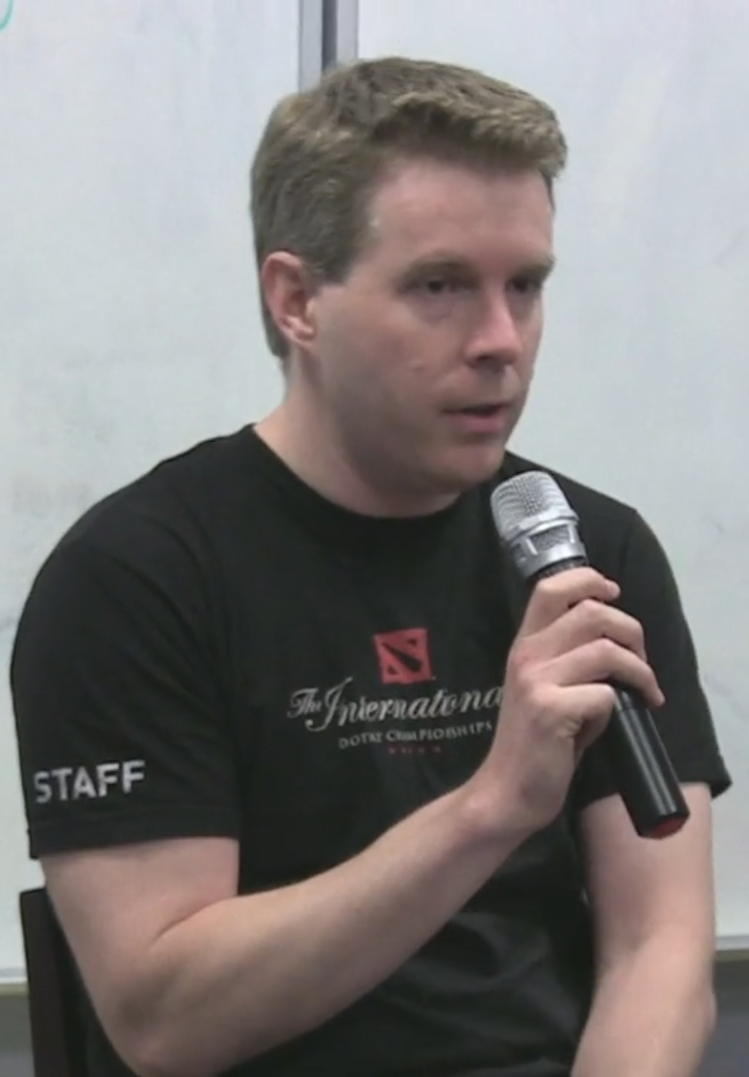
Robin Walker (pictured in 2013) was the project lead for Alyx.

After releasing Half-Life 2 in 2004, Valve began developing a trilogy of episodic sequels, planning to release shorter games more frequently. Half-Life 2: Episode One was released in 2006, followed by Episode Two in 2007, which ended on a cliffhanger. Episode Three was scheduled for 2008, but was canceled. The Half-Life: Alyx project lead, Robin Walker, said that Valve uses the Half-Life series to "solve some interesting collision of technology and art that had reared itself", but had failed to find a unifying idea that provided a sense of "wonderment, or opening, or expansion" for Episode Three.

After the release of Left 4 Dead in 2008, Valve abandoned episodic development and made several failed attempts to develop further Half-Life projects. They decided to complete their new engine, Source 2, before beginning a new game, as developing Half-Life 2 and the Source engine simultaneously had created problems. In 2016 and 2017, the Half-Life writers Marc Laidlaw, Erik Wolpaw, Jay Pinkerton and Chet Faliszek left Valve. Coupled with Valve's support for their other franchises, journalists took the departures as an indicator that new Half-Life games were no longer in development. Walker blamed the lack of progress on Valve's flat management structure, whereby employees decide what to work on themselves. The team decided they would be happier if they worked together on a large project, even if it was not everyone's preferred choice.

By 2013, Valve was experimenting with VR using Half-Life 2 as a basis. In 2015, they collaborated with the electronics company HTC to develop the HTC Vive, a virtual reality headset released in 2016. Valve's president, Gabe Newell, aimed for Valve to become more like Nintendo, which develops games in tandem with hardware, allowing them to create innovative games such as Super Mario 64 (1996). In 2016, Valve released The Lab, a collection of VR minigames, and recognized that many players wanted a more ambitious VR AAA game. Walker wondered if they could develop a VR "killer app" equivalent to the influential FPS Doom in 1993.

=== Production ===
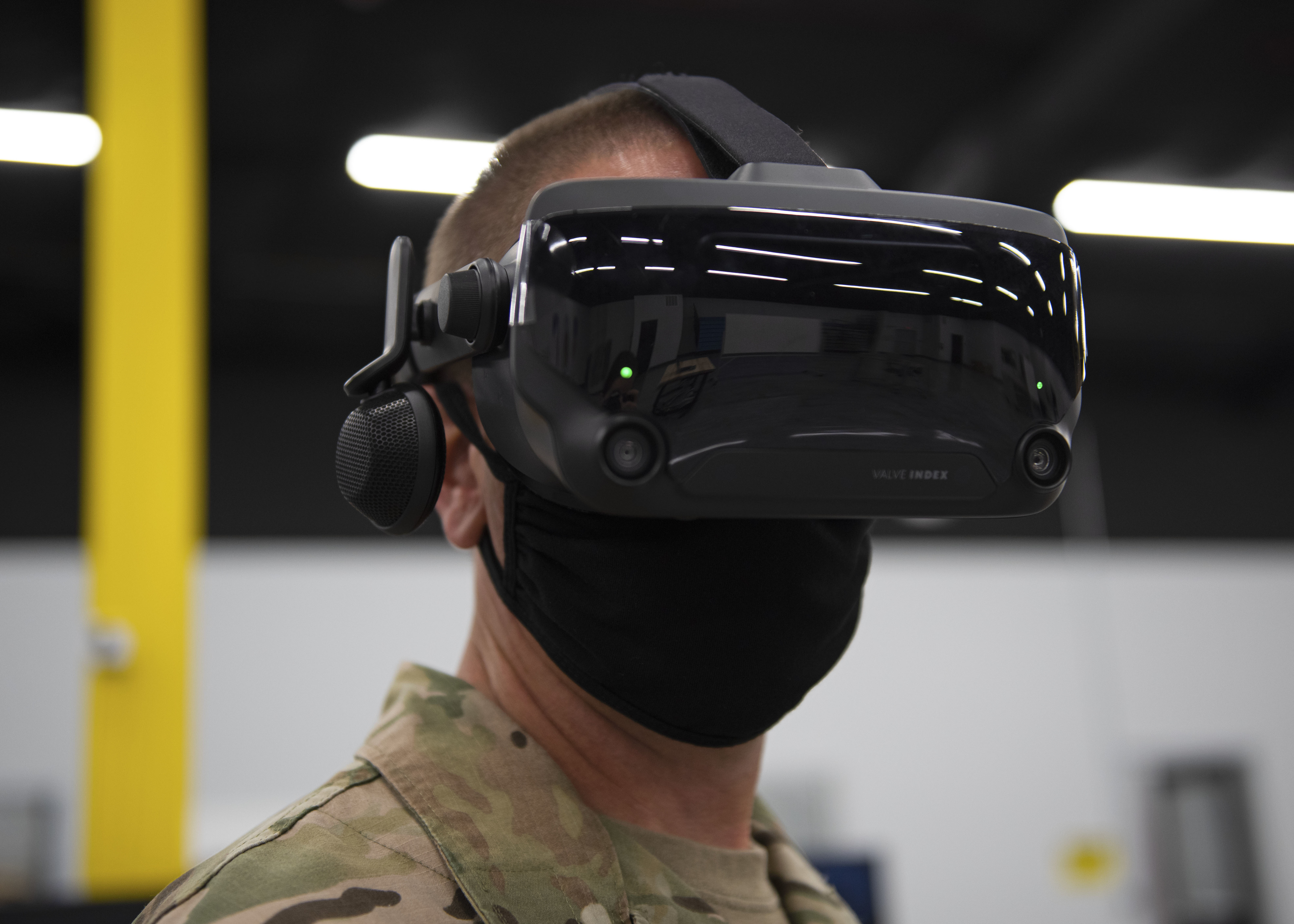
A U.S. Air Force member using a Valve Index VR headset

Valve developed several VR prototypes, with three projects under development by 2017. They found the portal systems of their puzzle series Portal were disorienting in VR, but that the Half-Life systems were a natural fit. Walker said that Half-Life 3 had been a "terrifyingly daunting prospect", and the team saw VR as a way to return to the series. Additionally, they anticipated that fans would react negatively if Half-Life 3 were a VR-only game and felt a prequel carried less weight.

Valve built prototypes using Half-Life 2 assets and narrowed the gameplay systems to those that best fit VR. VR affected almost every aspect of the design, including combat, level design and pacing. For example, shooting in VR, which requires the player to physically position their hand in space, is a different experience from aiming with traditional mouse-and-keyboard controls.

Mike Morasky, the composer for Portal 2 and Team Fortress 2, wrote the score in consultation with Kelly Bailey, the composer for previous Half-Life games. He cited industrial music by acts such as Nine Inch Nails, the Prodigy and Skinny Puppy as inspiration.

Half-Life: Alyx entered development around February 2016 and entered full production later that year. The team, comprising around 80 people, was the largest in Valve's history, and included Campo Santo, a studio Valve acquired in 2018. As Valve had repeatedly failed to see projects through, some staff were reluctant to join and many were skeptical that VR was the right direction.

Valve did not develop a non-VR version of Alyx as they were confident that it would only be possible in VR. They anticipated that fans would modify it to run without VR equipment. Though this bothered some on the team, Walker was not concerned, as he believed it would offer an inferior experience and demonstrate why they had chosen VR. In late 2018, Valve held a company-wide playtest of the entire game. The results convinced them that VR had been the right choice. The final weeks of development took place remotely due to the COVID-19 pandemic.

=== Movement ===
To mitigate the problem of motion sickness in VR, Valve implemented several movement options. They cited inspiration from the 2018 VR game Budget Cuts, which uses teleporting to move the player between locations. Valve had assumed that teleportation would damage the experience; however, though teleporting appears jarring when watching others use it, they found that players quickly became accustomed to it. According to Walker, "It recedes to the background of your mind, and you become much more focused on what you're doing with it."

To disincentivize players from quickly teleporting through levels, Valve filled areas with elements to capture their attention and slow them down, such as threats, collectables, set pieces, or other points of interest. To solve the problem of taller players having to crouch when moving through some spaces, Valve standardized the player's virtual body size when they teleport, effectively making every player the same height when teleporting. They found that players did not notice this discrepancy as they were focused on moving to their goal.

=== Combat ===
Every weapon is used one-handed, as Valve wanted players to have a hand free to interact with the world at all times. The crowbar, a weapon from previous Half-Life games, was omitted as Valve could not make melee combat work in VR, and because players would accidentally catch it on game objects as they moved, creating confusion. Additionally, players associated the crowbar with Gordon Freeman, the protagonist of previous games. Valve wanted to create a different identity for Alyx, portraying her as a "hacker and tinkerer". Other discarded weapon concepts include a trip mine, slingshot, shield and rocket launcher.

As players move at more realistic speeds in VR compared to typical FPS games, Valve had to adjust enemies to make combat fair and fun. Antlions, returning enemies from Half-Life 2, would quickly overwhelm players with their speed. The team slowed the antlions' movement and added the ability to shoot their legs off to slow them down. Fast zombies and fast headcrabs, also introduced in Half-Life 2, were cut as they were too frightening for some players in VR. According to the designer Dario Casali, "The shock of having [them] come around the corner and latch onto you before you'd even know what was going on was just too much."

=== Jeff ===
Jeff, a blind monster in chapter seven, came from the idea of forcing the player to share space with a frightening entity in VR. The team created several versions, including a Combine robot, before settling on a horror-influenced creature. Valve forced players to do things they dreaded but found enjoyable, such as leading them to the realization that they had to release Jeff after trapping him. They also gave the player more opportunities to escape when Jeff caught them, as near-deaths were exciting and too many deaths proved frustrating. Combat sequences with other enemies, designed to demonstrate Jeff's strength, were removed as they distracted from the tension.

The chapter contains more physics objects than the entirety of Half-Life 2, and was set in a distillery to explain the abundance of bottles the player can throw to distract Jeff. It includes alien spores that cause Alyx to cough, drawing Jeff's attention. After playtesters instinctively covered their mouths, the team implemented this into the design. This also added strategy, as players have to keep one hand free to carry a bottle. At the end of the chapter, the player traps Jeff in a trash compactor. Most playtesters chose to activate the compactor and crush him.

=== Casting ===
Merle Dandridge reprised her role as Alyx for initial recording sessions in March 2019, but after playtests indicated that Alyx needed a younger voice, Ozioma Akagha was cast in September 2019. Akagha avoided using irritation in her performance, as "you don't want someone in your head that sounds irritated with you".

Additional actors include James Moses Black as Eli, replacing Robert Guillaume, who died in 2017, and Rhys Darby as Russell, who added comedic elements. Returning actors include Tony Todd as the alien Vortigaunts, Mike Shapiro as the G-Man, and Ellen McLain as the voice of the Combine broadcasts. Shapiro recorded his lines in one 20-minute take, with pickups in 2019. Cissy Jones (Olga) and Rich Sommer (Larry, Russell's drone, and Combine Soldiers) were cast at the suggestion of the writer Sean Vanaman, who had worked with them on Campo Santo's Firewatch (2016).

=== Writing ===
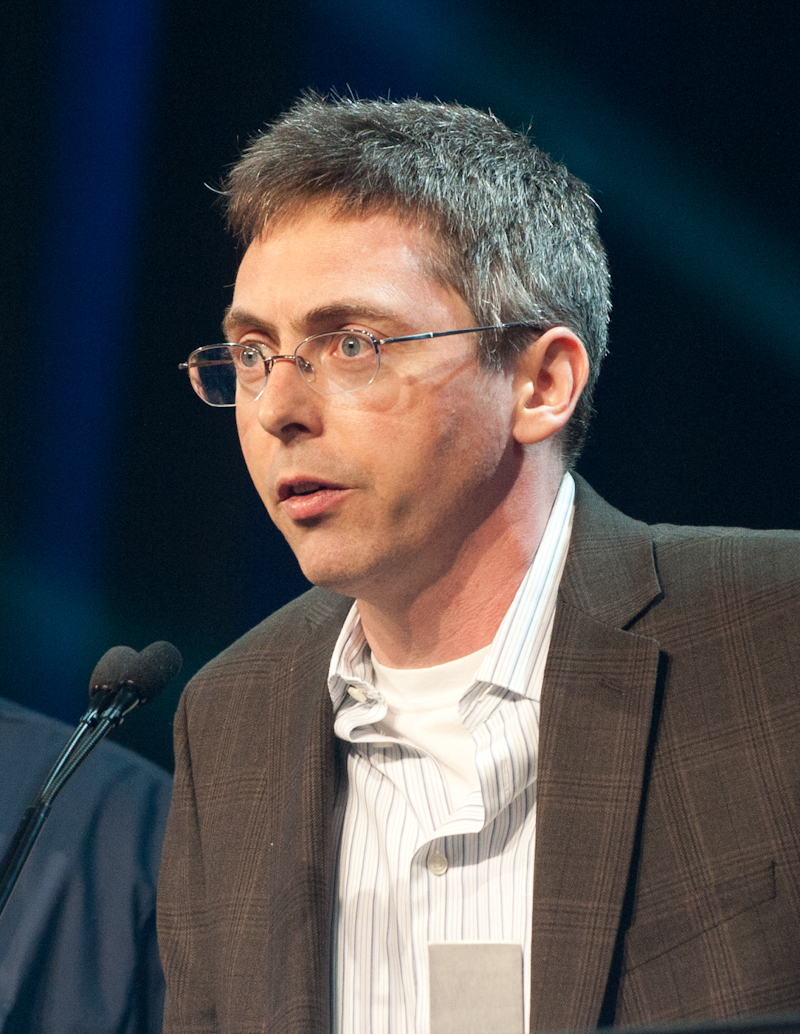

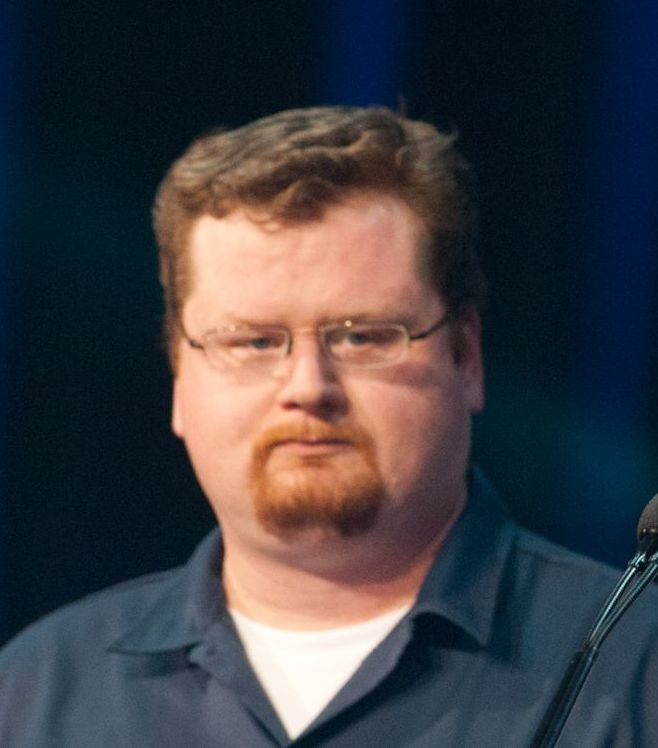
The writers Erik Wolpaw (top) and Jay Pinkerton rejoined Valve to write Alyx.

Wolpaw and Pinkerton turned down invitations to return to Valve early in the Alyx development. Instead, Valve recruited Rob Yescombe of The Invisible Hours, who worked on Alyx in 2017 and 2018. Yescombe's narrative was darker than previous Half-Life games, with scenes of dread, torture and horror. The antagonist was a female Combine officer named Hahn; in one proposed ending, Alyx would kill Hahn in revenge for torturing her father. Yescombe also proposed an ending in which Alyx and the G-Man would travel back in time to the events of the first Half-Life to prevent Freeman from triggering the alien invasion.

After the company-wide playtest in 2018, feedback was overwhelmingly positive save for the story, which employees scored the lowest of any Valve game. Morasky described it as "dark, serious and laborious", likening it to a Zack Snyder superhero film. The designer Corey Peters said the feedback vindicated their misgivings.

Valve initially planned to launch Alyx alongside its Index VR headset in June 2019, but delayed it to address the story. They re-enlisted Wolpaw and Pinkerton to rewrite the plot and dialogue while preserving the gameplay, along with Jake Rodkin and Sean Vanaman, who had joined when Valve acquired Campo Santo. Laidlaw, who retired in 2016, denied reports that he had provided consultation, saying he had confidence in Pinkerton and Wolpaw and that he did not want them "second-guessing" him.

The new writing team identified three problems. First, the nature of a prequel meant that players knew the characters would survive, reducing suspense. Second, the story did not have an impact on the overall Half-Life story; the writers did not want Alyx to feel "just like a hermetically sealed short story in the world of Half-Life". Third, the game had to end with the powerful G-Man giving Alyx something for freeing him. The team wanted the ending to have a meaningful impact and end the "narrative limbo" fans had been in since Episode Two.

Having Alyx and the G-Man travel forward in time and rescue Eli at the end of Episode Two was suggested by the character artist Jim Murray. The team was reluctant, as this undid the Episode Two cliffhanger, but were intrigued by the questions it raised about the world and how it pushed the Half-Life story forward. Newell said the ending represented a "self-critical realization" that Valve needed to advance the story. The change required Valve to create new assets, such as the Episode Two White Forest helicopter hangar and models for Dog, the older Eli and Gordon Freeman.

While previous Valve games use silent protagonists, the writers found that having Alyx speak improved the storytelling. They added radio dialog between Alyx and Russell as a simple way to "bring the energy up" whenever needed. The red herring, wherein Alyx believes she is rescuing Gordon Freeman before discovering the G-Man, was conceived by Vanaman late in production. As there was no character model for the Combine scientist Alyx overhears, the scene was animated in shadow play. The final script was 280 pages long, compared to 128 pages for Half-Life 2 and 18 for Half-Life.

== Release ==
Aiming to avoid the delays of previous games, Valve waited until Half-Life: Alyx was almost complete before announcing it. The announcement was made via Twitter on 18 November without screenshots or further information, saying only that it was "Valve's flagship VR game", with a full reveal later that week. Valve was conscious that players, having waited years for a new Half-Life game, might be disappointed by a VR game, and tightly managed the announcement. To promote Alyx, Valve made the prior Half-Life games free on Steam from January 2020 until its release. Valve was due to showcase Alyx at the 2019 Game Awards that December, but canceled hours prior, saying they were "hard at work on the game".

Alyx was released on March 23, 2020. It was free to owners of Valve Index headsets or controllers. Valve released a Linux version on May 15, along with Vulkan rendering support for both platforms. A pre-release build was mistakenly released on Steam; it included non-VR developer tools, allowing interactions such as picking up objects and firing weapons. However, most basic interactions, such as pressing buttons or filling Alyx's backpack, could not be completed with mouse-and-keyboard controls. Asked about plans for future Half-Life games, the designer David Speyrer said Valve was willing but were waiting for the reaction to Alyx. Walker said "we absolutely see Half-Life: Alyx as our return to this world, not the end of it".

Alyx is included with all Steam Frame headsets, a standalone VR headset released by Valve in September 2026. Valve ported Alyx to run on the Steam Frame's ARM64 processor and optimized it with foveated rendering, whereby resolution is reduced in areas the player is not looking at. The Steam Frame can also stream the PC version using Steam Link.

=== Mods ===
Mod tools for the Source 2 engine and Steam Workshop support for Half-Life: Alyx were released on May 15, 2020. Valve announced plans to release a new Hammer level editor for Source 2, and planned to release a partial Source 2 software development kit for the updated features later, with the focus at launch on shipping and supporting Alyx.

In March 2023, fans released the "NoVR" mod, which allows Alyx to be played without a VR headset. This also allows Alyx to run on less powerful devices, such as the Steam Deck. Reviewers found the mod removed immediacy and that mouse-and-keyboard controls could not replicate the dexterity of VR controllers.

== Reception ==
Reception

Aggregate scores
| Aggregator | Score |
|---|---|
| Metacritic | 93/100 |
| OpenCritic | 97% recommend |

Review scores
| Publication | Score |
|---|---|
| Destructoid | 9/10 |
| Edge | 9/10 |
| Game Informer | 9/10 |
| GameSpot | 9/10 |
| IGN | 10/10 |
| PC Gamer (US) | 92% |
| The Guardian | 5/5 |
| USgamer | 4.5/5 |
| VG247 | 5/5 |

Half-Life: Alyx received "universal acclaim", according to the review aggregator website Metacritic. According to the review aggregator OpenCritic, it was recommended by 97% of critics. By April 2020, it was one of the 20 highest-rated PC games on Metacritic. VG247, TechRadar and Video Games Chronicle described it as VR's "killer app".

The announcement trailer was watched more than 10 million times within the first 24 hours of its release. Though most fans expressed excitement, some were disappointed that Alyx was only available in VR, a small but growing market in 2019. Vic Hood of TechRadar expressed enthusiasm but wrote that "we forever live in hope" for Half-Life 3. Kevin Webb of Business Insider wrote that Alyx could "spark fresh interest in an industry [VR] that has struggled to win over hardcore gamers". Andrew King of USGamer suggested that Alyx would test whether the modding community would embrace VR, a difficult area to work in.

In IGN, Dan Stapleton wrote that Alyx was one of the best shooter games and the best VR shooter by far. He felt that Valve "set a new bar for VR in interactivity, detail, and level design ... It feels like a game from the future, and one that the rest of VR gaming will likely take a good long while to match, much less surpass." In Polygon, Ben Kuchera wrote of how Alyx transformed FPS systems. For example, he felt that reloading guns, traditionally performed with a button press, was more fun in VR. He wrote: "The magic lies in being inside the world, being able to touch it, and interact with it, directly. The game's design and pacing would lose all meaning if played as a standard game, even if more players would be able to experience the story for its own sake." In The Guardian, Rick Lane wrote of how VR improved the sense of place, providing a sense of "weight and power" to enemies such as headcrabs, and that Alyx was "nothing short of spectacular, delivering an expertly crafted Half-Life tale inside a knockout VR experience". Alyx won the Easy Allies 2020 awards for Best World Design and Game of the Year.

In Eurogamer, Devindra Hardawar wrote that the Steam Frame version, released in 2026, was "noticeably less sharp", with jagged edges and "muddier" textures, but came close to replicating the original and "still delivered a sense of awe". In Engadget, Devindra Hardawar wrote that Alyx "still feels like a premium VR experience" despite the reduced graphical fidelity.

=== Sales ===
The Valve Index headset, controllers, and base stations sold out in the US, Canada, and Europe within a week of the Alyx announcement. By mid-January 2020, they were sold out in all 31 regions. According to Superdata, Valve sold 103,000 Index units in the fourth quarter of 2019 as a result of the Alyx announcements, compared to the total 149,000 sold throughout 2019, and the Index was the highest-selling VR headset for PCs during that quarter. Though Valve had expected to supply several Index orders in time for the release of Alyx, the COVID-19 pandemic limited their supply chain.

Valve's Greg Coomer said Valve knew many people would not play Alyx on launch and that its audience was "relatively small right now". Newell described it as a "forward investment" into long-term technologies. In 2021, PCGamesN wrote that though it was "artfully crafted", Alyx had had little cultural impact. As of December 2024, Alyx had sold more than two million copies.

=== Awards ===
Half-Life: Alyx won "Game of the Year" at the 2020 VR Awards. At the Game Awards 2020, it was nominated for "Best Game Direction", "Best Audio Design" and "Best Action", and won for "Best VR/AR". At the 17th British Academy Games Awards, it was nominated for "Best Game", "Game Direction", "Audio Achievement" and "Artistic Achievement". At the 24th Annual D.I.C.E. Awards, it was nominated for "Action Game of the Year", "Outstanding Achievement in Game Direction", and "Outstanding Achievement in Game Design", and won for "Immersive Reality Technical Achievement" and "Immersive Reality Game of the Year".
