= Portal (series) =

Video game series by Valve

- Logo of the first game
- Genre: Puzzle-platform
- Developer: Valve
- Publishers: Valve; Microsoft Game Studios (2008)
- Creators: Kim Swift; Erik Wolpaw; Chet Faliszek
- Platforms: Windows; Xbox 360; PlayStation 3; OS X; Linux; Android; Nintendo Switch
- First release: Portal; October 10, 2007
- Latest release: Portal with RTX; December 8, 2022

Portal is a series of first-person puzzle-platform video games developed by Valve. Set in the Half-Life universe, the two main games in the series, Portal (2007) and Portal 2 (2011), center on a woman, Chell, who is forced to undergo a series of tests within the Aperture Science Enrichment Center by a malicious artificial intelligence, GLaDOS, that controls the facility. Most of the tests involve using the "Aperture Science Handheld Portal Device" – nicknamed the portal gun – that creates a human-sized, wormhole-like connection between two flat surfaces. The player-character or objects in the game world may move through portals while conserving their momentum. This allows complex "flinging" maneuvers to be used to cross wide gaps or perform other feats to reach the exit for each test chamber. A number of other mechanics, such as lasers, light bridges, high energy pellets, buttons, cubes, tractor funnels and turrets, exist to aid or hinder the player's goal to reach the exit.

The Portal games originated through bringing students and their projects from the DigiPen Institute of Technology into Valve and expanding upon the ideas in Valve's Source engine. The concept was introduced by the game Narbacular Drop, which became the basis for the first game. Another DigiPen game, Tag: The Power of Paint, formed the basis of the "Mobility gels" introduced in Portal 2.

Both games have received near-universal praise and have sold millions of copies. The first game was released as part of a five-game compilation, The Orange Box. Despite being intended as a short bonus feature of the compilation, it was considered the highlight of the collection. Its success led to the creation of the much longer and more in-depth Portal 2, which included both single player and cooperative multiplayer modes. In addition to the challenging puzzle elements, both games are praised for their dark humor, written by Erik Wolpaw, Chet Faliszek, and Jay Pinkerton, with notable voice work by actors Ellen McLain, Stephen Merchant, and J. K. Simmons. A number of spin-off media productions have been developed alongside the games, and several of the game's iconic elements have become parts of internet memes.

== Setting and characters ==
One of the in-game logos for Aperture

Both Portal games take place in the fictional "Aperture Science Computer Aided Enrichment Center". Aperture Science was founded by Cave Johnson (voiced by J.K. Simmons) and originally sought to make shower curtains for the military. Its research happened upon the discovery of portal technology, and soon became a direct competitor with Black Mesa Research Facility (from the Half-Life series) for government funding. Johnson acquired the rights to a disused salt mine in the Upper Peninsula of Michigan, where they started building a labyrinthine set of offices, laboratories, facilities, and test chambers. During this time, Johnson became poisoned from exposure to moon dust, a key component of the paint needed to support portal technology, and became increasingly deranged.

In Portal 2, the player explores these long-abandoned areas of Aperture, learning that the company had moved from testing on the country's finest, to paid volunteers, who were often homeless, and ultimately to coercing its own employees to participate in testing. Leading up to his death, Johnson ordered his lifelong assistant Caroline (voiced by Ellen McLain) to be the first test subject for a mind-to-computer transfer; her personality would ultimately form the core of GLaDOS (also McLain). Some time after Johnson's death, the old sections of the facility were vitrified, and a more modern facility was built atop the ruins. GLaDOS was built to control the facility and monitor the tests, but researchers found that the computer had villainous tendencies, threatening to kill the entire staff before it was shut down in time. The Aperture researchers constructed a number of "personality cores" that would fit onto GLaDOS to prevent her from turning against them. Despite this, on the day she was officially activated (coincidentally on "Take Your Daughter to Work Day"), she turned against the researchers and killed nearly everyone in the facility with lethal doses of neurotoxin gas. In the games and the comic Lab Rat, one employee Doug Rattmann survived due to his schizophrenia and distrust of GLaDOS. In trying to find a way to defeat GLaDOS, he finds that Chell, one of the human subjects kept in cryogenic storage within Aperture, has a high level of tenacity, and arranges for the events of Portal to occur by moving her to the top of GLaDOS' testing list. GLaDOS remains driven to test human subjects despite the lack of humans.

A promotional poster created by Valve artist Tristan Reidford, showcasing the characters from Portal. From center top clockwise: Chell, GLaDOS, P-Body (left) and Atlas, the turrets, Cave Johnson (in picture frame), a Companion Cube, and Wheatley

The player is introduced to Aperture in Portal, which is said by Valve to be set sometime between the events of Half-Life and Half-Life 2. The player-character Chell is awakened by GLaDOS for testing. Chell resists GLaDOS' lies and verbal ploys and succeeds in defeating GLaDOS' core. The destruction creates a portal implosion that sends Chell to the surface and leaves her unconscious. Rattmann, who has helped Chell by writing warning messages and directions to maintenance areas on the facility walls and had observed the final battle, escapes Aperture, but on witnessing a robot dragging Chell's body back inside, sacrifices his escape to assure that Chell is put into indefinite cryogenic storage. He himself is critically wounded but appears to make it to another cryogenic chamber, though his ultimate fate is not revealed.

Portal 2 takes place an unknown number of years after the events of the first game; the Aperture facility has fallen into disrepair without GLaDOS. A personality core named Wheatley (Stephen Merchant) wakes Chell from her sleep to help her stop a reactor failure, but inadvertently awakens GLaDOS, who had backed up her personality. Though they defeat GLaDOS by putting Wheatley in control of the facility, Wheatley is overwhelmed with power, sending Chell and GLaDOS, GLaDOS being temporarily reduced to a small computer powered by a potato, to the old core of Aperture, where GLaDOS rediscovers her relation to Caroline. They return to the surface where they are forced to defeat Wheatley before his ineptitude with the Aperture systems causes the facility reactors to become critical and explode. GLaDOS is returned to her original place and returns the facility to normal. GLaDOS then lets Chell go, realizing that the prospect of trying to kill her is too much trouble. Instead, she turns to two robots of her own creation, Atlas and P-Body, to locate a mythical store of additional human subjects kept in cryogenic sleep for her to continue testing on.

In addition to these characters, the game includes numerous laser-seeking turrets that seek to kill the player-characters, though are apologetic for it; most are voiced by McLain, though some defective ones in the sequel are voiced by Nolan North. GLaDOS introduces Chell to the "Weighted Companion Cube", appearing similar to other Weighed Cubes (crates) in the game, but decorated with hearts on its sides; GLaDOS attempts to make Chell believe the Companion Cube is a sentient object and a key to her survival, before having Chell dispose of it in an incinerator in order to leave a test chamber. Both games feature other personality cores that were constructed to keep GLaDOS in check; the first game includes three cores, the Morality, Curiosity, and Intelligence Cores, voiced by McLain as well as a snarling Anger Core voiced by Mike Patton. In Portal 2, three more such cores (beyond Wheatley) are introduced including the irrelevant Fact Core, the bold Adventure Core, and the space-obsessed Space Core, each voiced by North.

=== Characters ===
==== Chell ====
Chell is the player-character in both Portal games. She is a silent protagonist outside of small grunts during physical tasks. Very little truthful information is known about Chell; while GLaDOS makes many statements to Chell's background and history, GLaDOS herself admits she is unreliable. The only consistent fact that is used through the series is that Chell's parents gave her away. Whether they did it intentionally or not is unknown. Chell's appearance is modeled after Alésia Glidewell

==== GLaDOS ====
GLaDOS (Genetic Lifeform and Disk Operating System) is a rampant artificial intelligence computer system that controls Aperture Laboratories, and is the primary antagonist for the Portal series. She is voiced by Ellen McLain. She awakens the player-character Chell in the first game, tasking her through the dangerous testing course, but Chell manages to escape and appears to destroy her, though later revealed to have had her personality stored within a black box. Within the second game, Wheatley accidentally reawakens GLaDOS, and eventually convinces Chell to initiate a core transfer to replace her with himself. GLaDOS, placed into a module powered by a potato battery, is forced to work with Chell to depose Wheatley from power before the Aperture facility is destroyed. While exploring the older sections of the facility with GLaDOS's potato battery form (known informally as "PotatOS" by fans), it is revealed that her consciousness is based, at least in part, on an uploaded version of Cave Johnson's assistant, Caroline. Caroline was unwilling to be uploaded to a computer, but was forced to do so by Cave. This potentially contributed to GLaDOS's homicidal tendencies, alongside the mental adjustments and tweaking performed by the scientists working on her.

In the tie-in comic Portal 2: Lab Rat, it is revealed that the personality cores, such as Wheatley, were attached to GLaDOS in an attempt to manage and control her by acting as an artificial "conscience." Discussing the morality core, scientist Doug Rattmann quips, "You can always ignore your conscience."

=== Doug Rattmann ===
Doug Rattmann, often referred to as the "Ratman" is a character in both Portal and Portal 2. He was a former scientist working at Aperture and one of the few who survived when GLaDOS flooded the facility with neurotoxin. In the two games there are various "Ratman dens", where Doug Rattmann has left scribblings and paintings on walls in hidden rooms. Ratman's full appearance is only seen in the Portal 2: Lab Rat webcomic released by Valve prior to Portal 2's release to tie the story of the two games together. Ratman is the comic's main character. Prior to GLaDOS' rampancy and the neurotoxin release, Doug Rattmann was once an Aperture scientist. Already skeptical of the computer, the man fled from the gas and kept himself hidden from GLaDOS' view, slowly becoming more insane over an unknown stretch of time. Among the wall scribblings in the Portal dens is the sentence "The cake is a lie", which became an internet meme.

The Lab Rat comic reveals that, despite his madness, Doug Rattmann identified Chell as a rejected test subject due to her high tenacity, and moved her to the top of the queue for testing. During events in Portal, he worked behind the scenes to scribble messages and warnings to Chell on the walls, leading her out of the testing chambers and towards GLaDOS. After watching her defeat the computer, he managed to escape the facility, but returned to assure Chell would be put in indefinite cryogenic storage animation after she was dragged back inside, suffering a serious injury (a shot in the leg from a turret) to complete this. In the last panel of the comic, Doug Rattmann places himself in cryogenic storage animation. His fate by the events of Portal 2 is unclear, though more of the Ratman dens can be found.

=== Weighted Companion Cube ===
Weighted Companion Cubes are variants of Weighted Storage Cubes that are used in the testing chambers. They are differentiated from regular Storage Cubes with small pink hearts on its external surface, instead of an Aperture Science logo.

In Portal, during test chamber 17, Chell is given a Weighted Companion Cube by GLaDOS, told by her that it will be her faithful companion for the duration of the test. Chell must use the Cube to complete the chamber, at which point GLaDOS requires her to incinerate the Cube before being able to progress further. The requirement to incinerate the companion cube originates from test-play of Portal, during which players brought their companion cube with them to later levels, with unexpected impact on game play. Another Companion Cube is seen at the end of the game, standing next to the cake. In Portal 2, redesigned Weighted Companion Cubes appear in test chamber 7 in chapter 2. GLaDOS fizzles two of them at the start of the test to annoy Chell. Chell is given the option to take a Weighted Companion Cube with her at the end of the test, but if Chell does this, GLaDOS fizzles the Companion Cube before Chell can enter the lift leading to the next test chamber. A Companion Cube with the old design, supposedly the one from Portal, appears at the very end of the game, as it is ejected, charred and singed, from the shed (possibly at ground level) shortly after Chell's departure. Companion Cubes are also mentioned a lot in the Ratman dens in Portal. In the Lab Rat comic, Ratman is also accompanied by a Companion Cube, which he imagines talks to him.

Since its debut, the Companion Cube has become an internet meme, leading to a large series of merchandise and appearances in various other media.

=== Cave Johnson ===
Cave Johnson was the founder and CEO of the fictional company Aperture Science. He is mentioned in some of the alternative reality game information associated with Portal in describing the history of the company, while his presence in Portal 2 is through pre-recorded messages (voiced by J.K. Simmons) played while the player-character explores the depths of Aperture Science. Based on in-game information, Johnson is shown to have grown frustrated and jealous of his competitors despite receiving significant funding for the company's technology achievements, and slowly lost his mind over the years until his death from moon dust poisoning. It is revealed in the spin-off game Aperture Desk Job through retroactive continuity that, shortly before his death, Johnson's consciousness was transferred to a computer encased in a giant clay bust of his own head. Johnson instructs the player to end his suffering by shooting his power source with a newly invented turret, but this fails when his backup power is activated. He instead plummets into the depths of the Aperture Science facility, where it is assumed he remains for the entirety of the Portal series. The canonicity of this event has been debated; lead writer Erik Wolpaw stated that Aperture Desk Job and other side projects in the franchise are currently not canon, but noted they could eventually become canon if incorporated into a mainline Portal game.

=== Wheatley ===
Wheatley is one of GLaDOS' Personality Cores, voiced by Stephen Merchant and introduced in Portal 2, where he has become autonomous from GLaDOS. He appears to help rescue Chell from the failing cryogenic storage facility, but inadvertently reactivates GLaDOS. Eventually, Wheatley guides Chell to initiate a core transfer, allowing him to take over GLaDOS' capabilities, turning him corrupt with power and sending Chell and the GLaDOS potato-battery module deep into the bowels of Aperture Science. GLaDOS reveals that Wheatley was designed by Aperture's scientists as "the dumbest moron that ever lived", designed to hamper her decision-making processes. Wheatley's incompetence threatens to destroy Aperture, and Chell and GLaDOS are forced to work together to stop him. At the end of the game, Wheatley is banished to space via a portal on the moon, with a corrupted core orbiting around him.

=== ATLAS and P-body ===
ATLAS and P-body (known as Blue and Orange to GLaDOS) are player characters in the co-op campaign of Portal 2. They are two robots that cannot speak and can only produce grunts, which are voiced by Dee Bradley Baker. They are equipped with their own portal guns which bears the colour of its user (blue and purple for ATLAS, yellow and red for P-body). Atlas and P-Body are described as masculine and feminine, respectively, as stated by Chet Faliszek in an interview.

During the campaign, GLaDOS calls them Blue and Orange, respectively, and constantly tries to ruin their relationship by awarding one and ignoring the other. GLaDOS sends ATLAS and P-body into four areas to access data discs. Once done, they are blown up, as GLaDOS claims it is the only way they can be retrieved from these areas. Later, GLaDOS commands them to retrieve a certain "surprise" in an area. They go in search, only to find hundreds of thousands of other test subjects in suspended animation. After the co-op campaign is finished, GLaDOS quotes that they saved science. ATLAS and P-body begin to celebrate, only to be promptly blown up by GLaDOS.

In the DLC campaign "Peer Review", ATLAS and P-body are reactivated by GLaDOS one week after the original co-op campaign, during which GLaDOS has already wiped out all of the found test subjects in her attempts to turn them into "killing machines". The two robots are sent to find a saboteur that has taken control of a prototype central core and is causing problems in the facility. The saboteur is eventually revealed to be a bird pecking at the console's keyboard, which sends GLaDOS into a panic when she recognizes it as the one who tried to eat her during her time as a potato. ATLAS and P-body manage to shoo away the bird, earning a rare compliment from GLaDOS before she notices eggs in its nest. Instead of having them smashed, GLaDOS has the eggs taken to her chamber so that she can raise the baby birds to be her own little "killing machines".

According to GLaDOS, ATLAS and P-body were created for the Cooperative Testing Initiative and were supposed to phase out human testing after Chell escaped with Wheatley. However, she never got around to using them for testing. In the Portal 2 singleplayer campaign, Wheatley finds both ATLAS and P-body in storage and decided to kill both Chell and GLaDOS and use them instead. They later appear when Chell is granted liberty by GLaDOS.

Originally, the co-op player characters would be Chell (the single player character), and Mel, another human test subject. This concept was cut when playtesting showed that co-op characters would die a lot. The humans were replaced with infinite respawning robots. During the early phases of Portal 2, ATLAS and P-body's concept showed more of a Westworld feel.

== Gameplay ==
The player controls the main character (Chell in both single player campaigns, or Atlas and P-Body in the Portal 2 co-op campaign) from a first-person view, running, jumping, and interacting with switches or other devices. The player-characters are able to withstand large drops, but can be killed by falling in the toxic water of the facility, crushed to death, passing through laser grids, or fired on repeatedly by turrets.

Both games are generally divided into a series of test chambers; other sections of the game are more exploratory areas that connect these chambers. Each chamber has an exit door that must be reached, often requiring that certain conditions have been met such as having weighed down a large button with a "Weighted Cube", effectively a crate. These puzzles require the use of the Aperture Science Handheld Portal Device, the portal gun. The gun can be upgraded shoot two portals, colored differently for identification, on any flat surface that is painted with a specific paint containing moon dust. Once both portal ends are placed, the player can walk the character between them, or carry objects with the portal gun through them. Portal ends can be re positioned as often as necessary, but certain actions, such as walking through "emancipation grills" or moving a surface with a portal will cause the portals to dissipate.

A representation of how the (magnitude of) linear momentum is conserved through portals. By jumping into the blue portal, the player is launched out of the orange portal and onto the platform on the right.

A more advanced portal technique. The character builds up speed using two blue portals, to reach an otherwise unreachable area; after exiting the orange portal for the first time, the second blue portal is carefully created in mid-air, destroying the first blue portal in the process.

A critical feature of portals is that they retain the speed of the object traveling through it. When portals are placed on non-parallel planes, this can create the effect of "flinging". The player often uses gravity to build up their momentum when they fall into a portal, which flings them out of the other side to gain speed and distance that normal jumping and running could not generate. A leapfrogging effect can be used by placing portals in series during this flinging, gaining further momentum with each use.

Portals will also allow light and other objects to transfer through them, and numerous puzzles involve using portals to manipulate bouncing energy balls, lasers, "hard light" bridges, and tractor beams to access new locations or direct objects to specific receptacles that must be activated to open the level's exit. Portal 2 introduces "mobility gels" that can paint surfaces, including turrets and cubes, that can also move through portals though not directly by the player. The gels can create a surface that repels the player (Repulsion Gel), increases the player's speed (Propulsion Gel), or allows the surface to accept portals (Conversion Gel).

The games' credit sequences feature the songs "Still Alive" and "Want You Gone" composed by Jonathan Coulton, and, in its original form, sung by Ellen McLain in the GLaDOS voice. Portal 2 also features the song "Exile Vilify" by The National.

== History ==
An animated history of how the Portal project came to Valve

The concept of Portal came from Narbacular Drop, a student project from the DigiPen Institute of Technology. The game included the aspects of placing portals on any flat surfaces and using them to maneuver around levels. Several Valve employees, attending a DigiPen career fair, saw Narbacular Drop and offered the entire team jobs at Valve almost immediately to help expand on their idea.

Valve originally saw Portal as an experimental game to be included with its upcoming compilation, The Orange Box, alongside its release of Half-Life 2: Episode Two and Team Fortress 2. To give the game character, a minimal story, tied loosely with the Half-Life world, was written by Valve's Erik Wolpaw. He needed a character to guide the player through the game, coming onto a polite but humorous artificial intelligence, which would ultimately become the character of GLaDOS.

Portal's release with The Orange Box received near-universal praise, with the standalone game earning an aggregate Metacritic rating of 90 out of 100. With success of the game, work on an expanded sequel began nearly immediately, expanding the development team from 8 to about 30-40 programmers. Initial ideas for Portal 2 retained the idea of solving puzzles through scientific concepts, but eliminating the use of portals altogether; these versions did not fare well with test audiences nor with Gabe Newell, Valve's president; these ideas were dropped though saved for potential reuse in a different game by Valve. Portal 2 development was restarted specifically to keep the portal concept but adding new elements to freshen the gameplay.

During this period, Valve had witnessed another student project out of DigiPen, Tag: The Power of Paint, which allows the player to spray paint onto surfaces to alter their behavior. The team was brought into Valve, though not initially as part of the Portal franchise. The Tag team had found a way to incorporate their paints with real-time fluid dynamics code previously made by Valve, and the concept became the "conversion gels" found in Portal 2.

Valve included a co-operative play mode, based on their own observations and stories from players about working out the solutions to Portal's puzzles in a group environment. With this feature, they sought the ability to enable cross-platform play of Portal 2 between computers and consoles through Steamworks. This led to a surprise reveal by Newell that Portal 2 would be released on the PlayStation 3, despite previously expressing how he felt about the difficulties in supporting the console, and that it would include support for cross-platform play between the PC and PS3 versions through a limited Steamworks interface. Valve brought in writer Jay Pinkerton, who had formerly worked on National Lampoon, as well as Left 4 Dead writer Chet Faliszek to assist Wolpaw with the larger story. They built on the character of the Aperture Science facility, providing a deeper story for GLaDOS and Aperture's CEO Cave Johnson, as well as developing several concepts for "personality cores" that ultimately led to the creation of Wheatley.

Portal 2 received similar acclaim to its predecessor at launch, garnering a Metacritic score of 95 out of 100. Valve has continued to support the game through the release of two separate downloadable content packages, one introducing a new co-operative campaign, and a second that incorporated an easy-to-learn level editor that allowed players to make their own test chambers and share these through the Steam Workshop to others. An alternate version of Portal 2 designed for educational use was developed for Valve's Steam for Schools program, and was made available for free. While experimenting with VR systems in 2017, Valve attempted to implement Portal-like gameplay, but early playtesters found the game's titular mechanic disorienting in VR. Valve instead returned to the Half-Life series and released Half-Life: Alyx in 2020.

In April 2022, Erik Wolpaw urged Valve to make Portal 3, saying, "I am... not getting any younger. We are reaching the point where – it's crazy to think – [we're] literally going to be too old to work on Portal 3. So we should just do it." In September, Ellen McLain also called for Portal 3, stating that she was willing to star in it, and asked fans to "write in. Email Valve. You've got my blessing".

== Games ==
Release timeline
2007	Portal
2008	Portal: Still Alive
2009
2010
2011	Portal 2
2012
2013
2014
2015
2016
2017	Bridge Constructor Portal
2018
2019	Aperture Hand Lab
2020
2021
2022	Aperture Desk Job
2022	Portal: Companion Collection
2022	Portal with RTX

=== Portal ===
Portal was initially released in October 2007 as part of a compilation game called The Orange Box, alongside Half-Life 2 and its two episodes and Team Fortress 2. Valve considered including Portal as a bonus feature of the compilation; the game was purposely kept short such that if it did not meet expectations, players would have the rest of the content of The Orange Box as a "safety net". Portal has since been repackaged on Windows as a standalone game in April 2008. A Mac OS X client was introduced simultaneously with the release of the Steam client for that platform in May 2010; as part of its promotion, the game was released free of charge for both platforms during which at least 1.5 million players downloaded it.

==== Portal: Still Alive ====
Portal: Still Alive was a standalone version of Portal with additional content for the Xbox Live Arcade, released in October 2008. The game included new achievements, additional challenges from the existing test chambers, and additional non-story levels based on those found in the Flash-based Portal: The Flash Version created by We Create Stuff.

==== Portal with RTX ====
In September 2022, Nvidia announced it would release an updated version of Portal with real-time ray tracing, as a free DLC for owners of the original game on PC. It was released on December 8, 2022.

=== Portal 2 ===
Portal 2 was released as a standalone game in April 2011 on both computers and consoles. It is considered one of the greatest video games of all time by numerous publications and critics. It received acclaim for its gameplay, pacing, dark humor, writing, the voice work of McLain, Merchant, and Simmons, and its challenging but surmountable learning curve.

=== Portal: Companion Collection ===
Portal: Companion Collection is a compilation of both games and Still Alive content released for Nintendo Switch on June 28, 2022. The port was developed in collaboration with Nvidia Lightspeed Studios.

== Spin-offs and other media ==
=== Potato Sack ===
The Potato Sack was an A.R.G (alternate reality game) conceived by Valve and 13 indie video game developers as a prelude to the release of Portal 2. Portal 2 had been announced by a similar game, where a patch applied to the Steam version of Portal in March 2010, provided clues heralding the official announcement. The Potato Sack game, launched on April 1, 2011, led to the reveal of "GLaDOS@home", a spoof of distributed computer challenges, to get players to cooperate on playing the independent games as to unlock Portal 2 on Steam about 10 hours before its planned release.

=== The Final Hours of Portal 2 ===
The Final Hours of Portal 2 is a digital book written and created by Geoff Keighley released on May 17, 2011. This digital book gives insight on the creation of Portal 2. Keighley had previously worked as an editor at GameSpot, writing several 10,000-word "Final Hours" pieces on various games where he visited the studios during the late development phases to document the creation of the game. One piece, "The Final Hours of Half-Life 2", allowed Keighley to interact with Valve during 2003 and 2004 and talk with the staff as they completed work on Half-Life 2. Keighley wanted to recreate a similar work for Portal 2, with focus on making it an interactive work for the iPad. Keighley was granted "fly on the wall" access to Valve when Portal 2 was being produced. The initial iPad release was written by Keighley with work by Joe Zeff Design, a studio that had also produced digital applications for Time magazine. The interactive work provides movie clips and short applications to demonstrate the various mechanics of the game and stages of the game's development. The work was later ported into a non-interactive eBook, and into an application with the same iPad interactivity on the Steam platform. With the iPad and Steam version, Keighley is able to offer live updates to the work; upon release of the "Peer Review" downloadable content pack, the work was updated with an additional chapter discussing the creation of the new content and what new features players could expect in the future from Portal 2.

=== "Portal 2: Lab Rat" ===
An early chamber in Portal 2 which includes art drawn by Michael Avon Oeming and Andrea Wickland as the in-game Rat Man character. The artwork depicts the events of the first game and ties in with the "Lab Rat" comic.

To help the players develop the fictional history of Aperture Science, Valve created a digital comic to tell the story of the "Rat Man", a schizophrenic who is unseen in the games themselves but creates murals and scrawlings that guide Chell in both games. The comic, "Portal 2: Lab Rat", takes place both during and after Portal, explaining the events that led to Portal 2. The Rat Man's artwork appears early in Portal 2, where it retells the plot of Portal. Michael Avon Oeming, who had worked on comics for Valve games Team Fortress 2 and Left 4 Dead, and Valve in-house artist Andrea Wicklund drew the comic. Ted Kosmatka wrote most of the story with input from the Portal 2 writers. The 27-page comic was made available online in two parts about two weeks before the game's release and was also bundled with the game itself. Dark Horse Comics has published "Portal 2: Lab Rat" in a printed anthology of Valve comics, Valve Presents: The Sacrifice and Other Steam-Powered Stories, in November 2011.

In the comic, Doug Rattmann (also known as The Rat Man) is a scientist working in the Aperture facility. He escapes GLaDOS's initial neurotoxin attack, but suffers symptoms as his schizophrenia medication runs out, causing hallucinations of his Weighted Companion Cube talking. Noticing that Chell is uniquely tenacious among the test subjects held by Aperture, Rattmann moves her to the top of the queue of testing subjects, thus starting the events of the first Portal. After Chell defeats GLaDOS, Rattmann escapes Aperture, but returns against the Companion Cube's objections when he sees the Party Escort Bot dragging an unconscious Chell back inside and into a disabled cryo chamber. He ensures that Chell is kept in indefinite suspended animation, but he is shot by a turret in the process. He then enters a stasis pod himself, leaving his fate afterward unknown.

=== Portal: The Uncooperative Cake Acquisition Game ===
A board game version of Portal, developed by Cryptozoic Entertainment with oversight from Valve, was released in 2015. Titled Portal: The Uncooperative Cake Acquisition Game, the game tasks players with manipulating their tokens—representing unwitting test subjects—through various test chambers in Aperture Laboratories. The primary goal is to acquire cake slices by successfully navigating subjects through the chambers.

The basic gameplay loop involves moving subjects toward the opposite end of the board's tiles. These tiles are slowly recycled and moved back to the start, making the board function like a conveyor belt. When a tile is recycled at the end of the track, the player with the most subjects on that tile receives its associated rewards. Players must then protect their acquired cake slices from opponents, who can attempt to dispose of them by recycling the test chambers they reside in or by incinerating them using action cards. Additionally, the game features portals for faster movement, a Weighted Companion Cube that distracts subjects and prevents reward acquisition on its occupied tile, and a turret that eliminates all subjects on its tile. The game ends when a player runs out of either test subjects or cake slices, at which point the player with the most accumulated cake slices is declared the winner. In the event of a tie, the tied player with the most remaining test subjects wins. If a tie still persists, the tied players must appeal their cases to the other players in ten words or less, with the strict rule that none of the words used may contain the letter "E". Valve had initially approached Cryptozoic with the core concepts of the board game, which the publisher found required only minor gameplay modifications for balancing purposes.

=== The Lab ===
The Lab is a VR game developed by Valve that as part of its partnership with HTC and the VR headset, the HTC Vive. It was described as a "room-scale" VR experience, consisting of about a dozen small experimental experiences that highlight the use of VR; such include experiencing a fully panoramic view that has been stitched together from a number of photographs, a physics game where the player attempts to launch personality cores into piles of boxes using a catapult, and a bow-and-arrow based game. The Lab was announced at the 2016 Game Developers Conference, and was released free on April 5, 2016, following the public release of the HTC Vive.

=== Moondust: Knuckles Tech Demos ===
Moondust: Knuckles Tech Demos is a tech demo created for the Valve Index controllers which is set in the Portal universe. The game was released on Steam on June 21, 2018, however it is unlisted.

=== Bridge Constructor Portal ===
Valve licensed the use of Portal to Headup Games and Clockstone Software, the developers of Bridge Constructor, to develop Bridge Constructor Portal. The game follows the same type of gameplay as Bridge Constructor, where players are tasked to create a bridge from a limited set of parts to cross a river or chasm, using physics simulations to test if the bridge will hold up against traffic crossing it. Bridge Constructor Portal adds in elements from the Portal series, such as portals, as part of the construction challenge. The game is set within Aperture Laboratories, with the puzzles monitored by GLaDOS. The game released on December 20, 2017, for personal computers and mobile devices, and later in 2018 for PlayStation 4, Xbox One, and Nintendo Switch consoles.

=== Aperture Hand Lab ===
Aperture Hand Lab is a roomscale VR video game co-developed by Canadian studio Cloudhead Games and Valve, released free for Windows on June 25, 2019. It is a tech demo set in the Portal universe that showcases the functions of the hand, knuckle, and finger tracking technology used by the Valve Index.

=== Aperture Desk Job ===
Aperture Desk Job is a free game set in the Portal universe released on March 1, 2022. It is a demonstration of the various features of the Steam Deck handheld system. In the game, the player works as a quality assurance checker for toilets manufactured by Aperture Science in its early years. They are guided by the personality core Grady through the steps, but as the game progresses, mishaps in the automated factory lead Grady to suggest that the player develop a weaponized toilet as an invention to pitch to Cave Johnson.

=== Film adaptation ===
In February 2013, Valve president Gabe Newell and film director J. J. Abrams announced that they were to collaborate on a film adaptation of the Portal series. In 2016, Abrams stated that he still has plans to direct these films in the future, with both films in the writing stage. Abrams confirmed in May 2021 that the film adaptation was still in the works as they were still working on a script for the film from Warner Bros. Pictures. In 2026, Kane Parsons also expressed interest in directing a Portal film.

=== Pinball table ===
In March 2025, Multimorphic released a Portal-themed pinball table which was also available as a P^{3} plug-in playfield module. Ellen McLain provided original GLaDOS voice lines, and Marc Silk recorded lines for an additional personality core.

== In popular culture and other media ==
- During Portal, the player explores areas outside of the test chambers where scrawled messages left by Rattmann and others warn of GLaDOS' deception. In particular, while GLaDOS promises that Chell will receive cake for completing the training courses, the messages alert that this reward does not exist, and that "The cake is a lie". The phrase became an Internet meme, leading to numerous cake-related jokes, as well as its adaption as a term relating to a false promise. When writing Portal 2, Wolpaw stated that they were so sick of cake jokes that they purposely avoided any reference to them, save for one subtle nod.
- Valve has sold several Portal-based prints, T-shirts, and other memorabilia through its own store, often riding on the popularity of certain memes that the series has created. When first released, both were sold out in under 24 hours. Valve also has partnerships with other vendors for similar merchandise. WizKids has released collectible miniatures of the turrets, cores and companion cube(s) within the game.
- Minecraft officially features the Portal characters Chell, Atlas, and P-Body as cosmetic skins purchasable from the Minecraft Marketplace for Minecraft Bedrock Edition. The skin pack featuring these characters was originally released as DLC for Minecraft Xbox 360 Edition.
- Ellen McLain voiced the AI of the Jaeger suite in the 2013 film Pacific Rim, explicitly using the GLaDOS voice in the films trailer.
- Atlas appears as a player-character in the downloadable content package for Runner2.
- The crossover video game Lego Dimensions, which incorporates the use of Lego minifigures with a special gamepad, includes Portal-themed elements, as first demonstrated during its Electronic Entertainment Expo 2015 trailer. A Portal-themed level appears as part of the main story campaign, with GLaDOS playing a significant role in the game's plot. A Chell minifigure was released that comes packaged with buildable sentry turret and companion cube; the figure unlocks an additional level and open-world area based on the series when used in-game. The Portal levels include Easter eggs based on Doug Rattmann hiding himself away. The game also features a new song written by Jonathan Coulton and performed by Ellen McLain that plays over the end credits.
- The series' main antagonist, GLaDOS, was included as the dealer in Poker Night 2. This game features Portal themed unlockables such as playing cards, table and room. A "Paranoia Core" personality sphere is also featured as a bargaining chip.
- A Portal based pinball table for Zen Pinball 2, Pinball FX2, and Pinball FX3 was developed by Zen Studios in collaboration with Valve.
- GLaDOS guest stars in Defense Grid: The Awakening in a full-story expansion.
- A cosmetic set based on the Companion Cube was released as a visual replacement for the "Io" character in Valve's multiplayer online battle arena game, Dota 2.
- P-Body is a playable character in the Windows release of Super Bomberman R.
- In 2012, a laser engraved panel featuring Wheatley was launched aboard the Japan Aerospace Exploration Agency (JAXA)'s Kounotori 3 mission on its way to resupply the International Space Station.
- In April 2011, series of Portal-themed DLC levels were added to the game The Ball.
- A few Portal characters, including Chell and P-Body, feature as avatar customization items in the game Fall Guys for 5 crowns each.
- The portal gun is one of several weapons used alongside ones from other game and film franchises in a climactic fight for the 2021 film Free Guy which takes place within a video game.
- A reference to GLaDOS appears in a sub-quest in Cyberpunk 2077 as a murderous AI driving a taxi and eventually tries to kill the protagonist.
- In 2022, GEICO released a commercial entitled "The Gecko Visits Portal", featuring elements from the Portal games such as an unreleased test chamber shown in trailers for Portal 2, with McLain reprising her role as GLaDOS.
- Rocket League released free DLC that includes a variety of items from the Portal series available for vehicle customization.
- Evil Genius 2: World Domination includes a free Portal themed expansion pack which adds Portal-themed rooms and traps to the game.
- Escape Simulator features a free Portal Escape Chamber DLC in which players will need to escape from the Aperture Science Laboratories by solving various puzzles.

== Unofficial media ==
=== Portal: Prelude ===
Portal Prelude is a 2008 single-player mod that takes place before the events of Portal. A remastered version using Nvidia RTX Remix was released in 2023.

=== Portal Stories: Mel ===
Portal Stories: Mel is a single-player mod of Portal 2 released on June 25, 2015, developed by Prism Studios.

=== Portal Stories: VR ===
Portal Stories: VR is a single-player virtual reality fangame of Portal 2 released on May 16, 2016, developed by Prism Studios.

=== Aperture Tag: The Paint Gun Testing Initiative ===
Aperture Tag: The Paint Gun Testing Initiative is a 2014 first-person puzzle-platform video game developed by the Aperture Tag Team.

=== Thinking with Time Machine ===
Thinking with Time Machine is a single-player mod for Portal 2 released on April 18, 2014, developed by Ruslan Rybka, also known as Stridemann, and released by SignHead Studio.

=== Portal Reloaded ===
Portal Reloaded is a 2021 single-player mod for Portal 2 developed by Jannis Brinkmann.

=== Portal: Revolution ===
Portal: Revolution is a 2024 single-player mod for Portal 2 developed by Second Face Software. It serves as a prequel to Portal 2.

=== Mari0 ===
Mari0 is a fan-made video game released on March 3, 2012, that combines elements of the video games Super Mario Bros. and Portal.

=== Portal: No Escape ===
In August 2011, Dan Trachtenberg released a fan film based on the series called Portal: No Escape. The video would later go viral.

== In education ==
The Portal games have found application in educational aspects outside of game development. The first game was praised as an example of instructional scaffolding where the student is first given an environment to learn new tools with sufficient hand-holding, but these facets are slowly removed as the student proceeds. At least one college, Wabash College, introduced Portal as part of required coursework; at Wabash; the game is used as an example of Erving Goffman's dissemination on dramaturgy, The Presentation of Self in Everyday Life.

At a mid-2011 presentation at the 2011 Games for Change Festival at New York University, Gabe Newell stated Valve's intention to direct Portal and Portal 2 towards education. Newell stated that Valve "doesn't see divide between making a game that can do well and be educational", and was already working with schools to develop lesson plans around the game. In one example, Valve brought in students from nearby Evergreen School to watch them interact with the game in an educational setting. As part of this effect, the company promoted Portal for free use by any user during September 2011.

In speaking at the 2012 Games for Change Festival, Newell said that the response to these efforts was praised by educators. Their efforts culminated in a "Teach with Portals" program that Newell announced at the Festival. The effort is built on a standalone "Puzzle Maker" that incorporates the level editor for Portal 2 that was released as free content for the game in early 2012. Valve had built the Puzzle Maker with the aid of educators, as to make it suitable for lesson plans as well as making it as easy for teachers to use to construct such plans. The Puzzle Maker is not limited to physics, but designed to be modular so that other fields, such as fundamental electronics or chemistry, could be included. The "Teach with Portals" initiative is built atop a stripped-down version of the Steam client, "Steam for Schools", that is designed to be used in schools, allowing instructors to control the installation of the games and lesson plans on the students' computers. These tools, as well as copies of Portal 2 and the Puzzle Maker, are being offered for free for all educators.
