= Portal – No Escape =

2011 film by Dan Trachtenberg

Portal: No Escape
- Thumbnail of the short film
- Directed by: Dan Trachtenberg
- Written by: Dan Trachtenberg
- Based on: Portal by Valve
- Produced by: Cathleen Alexander; Stephen Hens; Ashley Adams
- Starring: Danielle Rayne
- Cinematography: Keith Dunkerley
- Edited by: David Trachtenberg
- Music by: Mike Zarin
- Release dates: July 22, 2011 (San Diego Comic Con); August 23, 2011 (YouTube)
- Running time: 7 minutes
- Country: United States
- Language: English

Portal: No Escape is a short fan film based on the Portal video game series directed by Dan Trachtenberg. The film was released on August 23, 2011, via YouTube. As of February 2026, the video has received over 28 million views.

== Plot ==
Chell (Danielle Rayne) wakes up in a room with no memory of who she is or how she got there. She notices something on the back of her neck. Using a piece of a mirror she has just broken, she discovers that it is a barcode. Seemingly concerned, she also spots mysterious tally marks drawn on a wall. Chell spends the following hours, or even days, decoding the graph in her mind, exercising, and eating food provided by the guards, while being observed by a security camera. Soon, she discovers the meaning of the scribblings, and finds a Portal Gun hidden behind a wall panel. Chell learns how to use the device, and when an officer comes to intervene, she drops her bed on him using the Portal Gun, and escapes. She manages to run away from the chasers, finding herself on a roof of a building, in an industrial area, and jumps off a building into a portal, to launch herself onto another building. While walking away from the officers, Chell realizes that she is in fact surrounded by giant screens that give an illusion of an open world.

== Production ==
In an interview with the Los Angeles Times, Trachtenberg said that the film was produced on a few thousand dollars. Additionally, according to Trachtenberg's Twitter posts, the film wrapped up production in early 2010; it took an additional year and a half to complete post-production.

== Reception ==
The short premiered July 22, 2011, at San Diego Comic-Con, at the end of a live podcast for The Totally Rad Show. The film was well received upon its release. On its first day, the video had reached 800,000 views. The video was later featured on VentureBeat's "Top 10 Best Gaming Videos of 2011" list. The film was so well received that New Line Cinema initially approached Trachtenberg to direct the film adaptation of Y: The Last Man. Trachtenberg also states that Bad Robot has become interested in him since the release of Portal: No Escape, but had been pitching other ideas along with his other film work; when Bad Robot presented him with the opportunity to direct 10 Cloverfield Lane, he saw similarities between it and Portal: No Escape, particularly on the opening featuring a woman in captivity with no idea how she got there, and was attracted to the project.
