= Jay Pinkerton =

Canadian writer

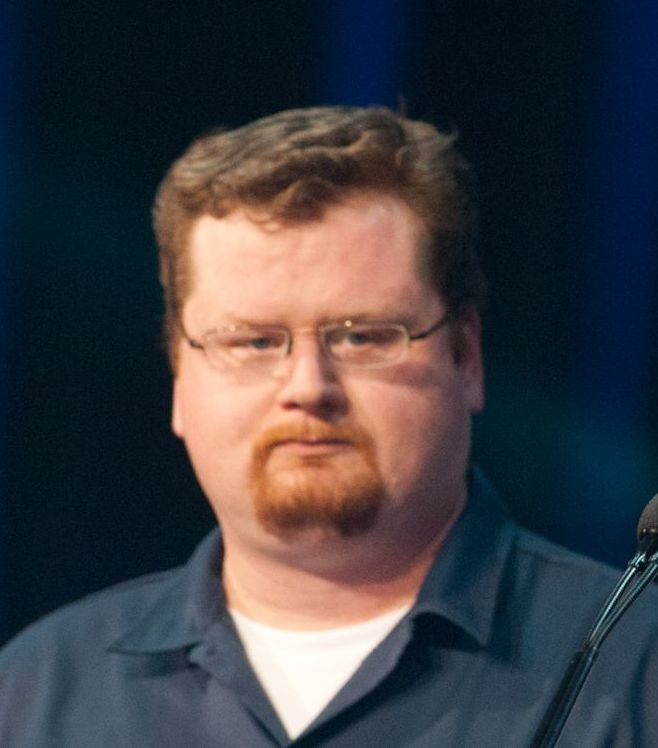
- Pinkerton in 2012
- Born: June 15, 1977 (age 49)
- Education: Queen's University
- Occupations: satirist, humourist, webmaster, managing editor
- Writing career
- Genres: Comedy, video games
- Notable works: Portal 2, Team Fortress 2 and Half-Life: Alyx

Jay Pinkerton (born June 15, 1977) is a Canadian humourist. He has written for the video game company Valve, where he worked on games including the Half-Life and Portal series. A former editor for Cracked and Cracked.com, he was referred to by PlayStation World as a "one-man gag machine". Prior to joining Cracked, Pinkerton was the managing editor of NationalLampoon.com, the website of the national comedy and film brand.

Jay Pinkerton initially registered his website, Jaypinkerton.com, to be a portfolio of his comedy and artwork. Afterwards, Pinkerton joined the forums of the Internet humour website "Pointless Waste of Time" (PWOT), and took the attention of the site's owner, David Wong, with whom Pinkerton worked on a now-defunct satirical news commentary, the "News Skim", and other comedy articles. Around this time, he first published his redone Spider-Man comics, spawning an internet phenomenon.

In addition to Cracked, Pinkerton's work has also appeared on McSweeney's Internet Tendency, Modern Humorist, CollegeHumor.com and numerous other sites. He has also had his humour writing published in print, including in Jest Magazine, McSweeney’s Best Non-Required Reading 2003, National Lampoon’s Big Book of Love, The CollegeHumor Guide to College and Golden Words.

Pinkerton joined Valve in 2008 and served as a writer for their games. In June 2017, he announced he had left Valve for unspecified reasons. However, he returned to resume working as a writer for Valve in July 2018. Some of his work on return included writing for Half-Life: Alyx, the first original AAA VR title released in 2020. Pinkerton worked as a writer on the Team Fortress Comics and helped confirm the release of the seventh and final issue in 2024.
