= Valve Index =

Virtual reality headset by Valve

- The Valve Index headset, controllers and tracking stations
- Developer: Valve
- Manufacturer: Valve
- Type: Virtual reality headset
- Generation: Second
- Released: June 28, 2019
- Lifespan: 2019-2025
- Introductory price: US$999
- Discontinued: November 12, 2025
- Operating system: Windows, Linux
- Display: Two 1440×1600 LCD displays with full RGB per pixel, supporting refresh rates of 80 Hz, 90 Hz, 120 Hz, or 144 Hz.
- Sound: Integrated headphones, 3.5mm audio jack, built-in dual microphone array
- Controller input: Knuckles controllers
- Camera: Front-facing 960×960 stereo cameras
- Connectivity: DisplayPort 1.2, USB 3.0 expansion port
- Backward compatibility: Supports HTC Vive and Vive Pro Controllers and HTC Vive and Vive Pro Base Stations
- Successor: Steam Frame
- Related: HTC Vive, HP Reverb G2
- Website: www.valvesoftware.com/index

The Valve Index is a discontinued virtual reality headset created and manufactured by Valve. Announced on April 30, 2019, it was released on June 28 of the same year. The Index is a second-generation headset and the first to be fully manufactured by Valve. Half-Life: Alyx is bundled with the headset. In November 2025, Valve announced a successor, the Steam Frame, launched in fall 2026.

== Development ==
Valve entered the VR space in the mid-2010s, demonstrating the Robot Repair VR demo at the 2015 Game Developers Conference. The following year, they partnered with HTC and released the HTC Vive, along with a series of "experiments" called The Lab. Plans to develop a new Half-Life game began after this, and Valve started a project named "The Prototype", helmed by Robin Walker. Concerned that other companies would limit the scope of VR technology, Walker felt that Valve had a duty as a game developer to get involved. Onboarding others in Hawaii opened up two more projects alongside the Index, those being the A.R.T.I. project and SimTrek. These plans ultimately fell through. Walker envisioned a controller that allowed for hand tracking, rather than just functioning as a remote control. The newly focused project developed a slimmed down headset and controllers, named the "Knuckles", that allowed for "believable" hands whilst in VR.

Development kits for the Knuckles, codenamed "EV2", were showcased in 2018. Design elements, such as the large trackpad, were adapted from the HTC Vive controllers. These were later toned down, with a thumbstick implemented and a "track button", which is a tracking surface that sat between the stock and now centralised buttons. Hand sizes were considered so that the 5th to 95th percentiles would not have issues holding the Knuckles. Extra size customisations were included, as was a strap. Capacitive sensors were included throughout the inner structure of the Knuckles and hand tracking, whilst rudimentary during development, allowed for "five fingered hands". Gabe Newell, President of Valve, expressed excitement to Game Developer about being able to "build much more interesting kinds of experiences" and expand beyond the conventional keyboard and mouse. Approximately several hundred pairs of Knuckles controllers were later distributed to developers as part of a kit for testing purposes. Despite the small number of developers reviewing, some uploaded videos of their prototype testing to sites such as YouTube. One such review by Brian Lindenhof found some quirks with the hand tracking A patent from Valve was later matched to the Knuckle controllers, with extra features including force resistant sensors, which uses electrical resistance to resist applied force, expanding game development options.

Tracking beacons for the controllers and headset were conceptualised and designed by Alan Yates, with the blueprints later shown at the 2016 Hackaday Supercon. Using infrared, multiple placed "beacons" can triangulate the location of the user and controllers, this was achieved with the use of a spinning mirror system bouncing IR into the surrounding area. Early challenges included finding a functional rotation speed of the mirror, and sourcing parts for mass production, instead of relying on eBay as they had up until that point. Early versions faced quality issues. Valve adopted the first revision, by this time known as Lighthouse Base Stations. By replacing certain parts of the internal design, Valve was able to reduce the production cost. The previous version had used a sync blinker system, which caused interference between beacons placed in the same setup. By changing to a "sync-on-beam" design, data encoded on sweeps, resolved the interference issue. Dropping one of the rotators to establish two beams from one light, meant that the required internal cabling of the beacons was simplified. Valve's changes to the first revision widened field of view and facilitated an easier setup for the end user.

== Release ==
An error on the Steam store page for the Valve Index listed a release date of 15 June 2019 initially. The headset eventually released on 28 June 2019, priced at US$999 for the full kit containing the headset itself, Knuckles controllers and tracking sensors. The Valve Index sold an estimated 149,000 sets in 2019. 103,000 were in the fourth quarter following the announcement of Valve's flagship VR game, Half-Life: Alyx, which was made free to Index owners, so that they could get the best possible experience with the title, whilst also giving access to limited time exclusive content in-game. The sudden demand caused the unit to be sold out in all 31 countries except Japan in January 2020. While Valve had anticipated supply for many of those that had ordered the Index in time for the March 2020 release of Half-Life: Alyx, the COVID-19 pandemic slowed production, which left Valve with a reduced number of units available on the release date. As of January 2025, 13.2% of the VR units connected to Steam are Valve Index sets.

In November 2026, Valve officially sunset the Valve Index.

== Technical specifications ==
=== Display ===
The headset has dual 1440 x 1600 LCDs with full RGB per pixel and low persistence global backlight illumination (0.330 ms at 144 Hz). It includes dual-element canted Fresnel lenses and provides a combined resolution of 2880 x 1600. The panels are full RGB and support refresh rates of 80, 90, 120, or 144 Hz. The estimated field of view is 108°. The panels and lenses can be adjusted horizontally to change the user's inter-pupillary distance (IPD) using a physical slider beneath the displays, with an IPD adjustment range of 58 to 70 mm.

=== Tracking ===
The headset and controllers both use lighthouse tracking systems, while retaining full compatibility with all previous HTC Vive base stations, using SteamVR.

The Valve Index utilizes Valve's Lighthouse 2.0 tracking system, which involves external base stations to establish a 3D tracking environment. These base stations are small, rectangular units placed around the room that emit non-visible infrared light and laser patterns. The headset and controllers, equipped with sensors, detect these signals to determine their position and orientation.

Each base station includes two rapidly spinning laser emitters that project a sweeping pattern of lasers across the room. Unlike the Lighthouse 1.0, which used an infrared Sync Blinker for synchronization, Lighthouse 2.0 employs a more refined synchronization mechanism integrated into the laser system itself. The sensors on the headset and controllers detect the laser beams to determine their exact positions relative to the base stations. Typically, two base stations are used to ensure comprehensive coverage and minimize occlusion, though additional base stations can be added to extend the tracking range.

Although the Valve Index uses external base stations, the tracking system is considered inside-out because the tracking sensors are mounted on the tracked devices themselves—the headset and controllers. These sensors process the tracking information internally, which differentiates it from traditional outside-in systems that use fixed cameras or sensors to monitor the tracked objects from outside.

In addition to the base stations, the Index's headset and controllers feature Inertial Measurement Units (IMUs) that provide rapid updates on movement and orientation. The IMUs track motion at several hundred Hz, but are prone to drift. The Lighthouse system compensates for this drift by using the base stations’ lasers to provide a precise positional reference, integrating this data with the IMU information to maintain accurate tracking even during fast movements.

This combination of external base stations and internal sensors on the tracked devices ensures the Valve Index provides accurate and responsive tracking performance.

=== Controls ===
The headset is intended to be used with the Valve Index Controllers—formerly known as the Knuckles Controllers—but is also backward compatible with the HTC Vive and HTC Vive Pro controllers. The Valve Index Controllers feature a thumbstick, touchpad, two face buttons, a menu button, a trigger, and an array of 87 sensors that track hand position, finger position, motion, and pressure to create an accurate representation of the user's hand in VR. Additionally, the controllers include an accelerometer for further measurements. In 2018, a tech demo called Moondust showcased the capabilities of an early version of the Knuckles.

=== Audio ===
The Index includes "a pair of ultra near-field, full-range, off-ear (extra-aural) headphones", which use Balanced Mode Radiator (BMR) drivers to produce accurate and low-frequency sounds. The headset also has a built-in microphone.

=== Other ===
Unlike its successor the Steam Frame, the Index requires a tethered connection to a PC.

== See also ==
- Reality Labs
- VirtualLink
- HTC Vive
