= Erik Wolpaw =

American video game writer

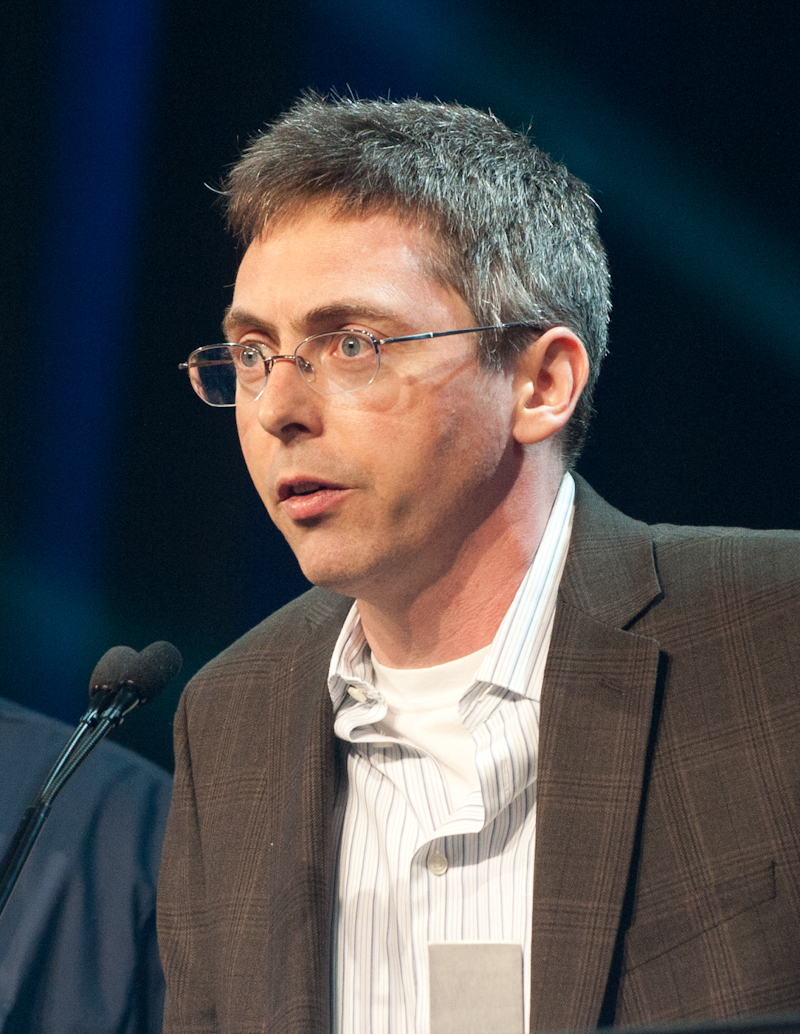
- Wolpaw in 2012
- Born: United States
- Occupation: Video game writer

Erik Wolpaw is an American video game writer. He and Chet Faliszek wrote the pioneering video game website Old Man Murray. He subsequently worked for game developers Double Fine Productions and Valve, and is known for his work on video games including Psychonauts (2005), Half-Life 2: Episode One (2006), Portal (2007), Portal 2 (2011) and Half-Life: Alyx (2020).

== Career ==
As a high-school student, Wolpaw wrote two games for the Atari 8-bit computers published as type-in programs in Antic magazine in 1983 and 1984. From 1997 to 2002, Wolpaw and Chet Faliszek wrote the video game-oriented website Old Man Murray. The site was highly influential in video game writing and game journalism. He also wrote for GameSpot.

He subsequently worked at Double Fine Productions as a writer for Psychonauts. In 2006, he won the Game Developers Choice Award for Best Writing for his story and dialogue contributions to Psychonauts. In 2004, Wolpaw joined Valve, where he and Faliszek wrote for games such as Half-Life 2: Episode One, Half-Life 2: Episode Two, Team Fortress 2, Left 4 Dead, Portal and Portal 2. He left Valve in February 2017 to write for Psychonauts 2, though he ended up not working on it. In January 2019, he confirmed that he had returned to Valve as a part-time contractor on Artifact and Half-Life: Alyx.

== Personal life ==
In 2004, Wolpaw was diagnosed with ulcerative colitis. Expecting his condition to require a departure from the company, he spoke with managing director Gabe Newell, who surprised him by offering an extended leave with pay. "Your job is to get better," Newell said. "That is your job description at Valve. So go home to your wife and come back when you are better."

== Works ==
Year	Title	Credits
2005	Psychonauts	Co-writer
2006	Half-Life 2: Episode One	Writer
2007	Half-Life 2: Episode Two	Writer
2007	Team Fortress 2	Co-writer
2007	Portal	Writer
2008	Left 4 Dead	Co-writer
2011	Portal 2	Writer
2018	Artifact	Writer
2020	Half-Life: Alyx	Co-writer
2022	Aperture Desk Job	Writer
