= Portal =

Portal may refer to:

== Arts and entertainment ==
=== Gaming ===
- Portal (series), a series of video games developed by Valve
  - Portal (video game), a 2007 video game, the first in the series
  - Portal 2, the 2011 sequel
    - Portal Stories: Mel, a mod for Portal 2
    - Portal Revolution, a mod for Portal 2
    - Portal Reloaded, a mod for Portal 2
    - Aperture Tag, a mod for Portal 2
    - Thinking with Time Machine, a mod for Portal 2
- Portal (1986 video game), a 1986 computer game by Activision
- Portal (Magic: The Gathering), a set in the Magic: The Gathering card game
- Portal (video game element), an element in video game design

=== Music ===
- Portal (band), an Australian extreme metal band
- Portal (album), a 1994 album by Wendy & Carl
- "Portal", a 2014 song by Lights Little Machines
- Portals (Arsonists Get All the Girls album), 2009
- Portals (Sub Focus and Wilkinson album), 2020
- Portals, a 2021 live album by Tesseract
- "Portals", by Alan Silvestri, from the soundtrack for the film Avengers: Endgame
- Portals (EP), a 2022 EP by Kirk Hammett
- Portals (Melanie Martinez album), 2023

=== Other uses in arts and entertainment ===
- Portal (comics), a Marvel Comics character
- Portal fantasy, fantasy subgenre involving travel to another world
- Portal (magic trick), an illusion performed by David Copperfield
- Portal (TV series), a series about MMORPGs
- Portal (sculptures), interactive art sculptures videoconferencing two cities
  - Vilnius–Lublin Portal, a 2021 interactive public art installation
  - New York–Dublin Portal, a 2024 interactive public art installation
- Portals (initiative), a public art initiative that connects people in different world cities through real-time videoconferencing
- The Portal (podcast), a podcast hosted by Eric Weinstein

== Computing ==
=== Gateways to information ===
- Captive portal, controlling connections to the Internet
- Enterprise portal, a framework to provide a single point of access to a variety of information and tools
- Intranet portal, a gateway that unifies access to all enterprise information and applications
- Web portal, a site that functions as a point of access to information on the World Wide Web

=== Other uses in computing ===
- Meta Portal, a screen-enhanced smart speaker
- Portal rendering, an optimization technique in 3D computer graphics
- Portals network programming API, a high-performance networking programming interface for massively parallel supercomputers
- Portal Software, a company based in Cupertino, California

== Places ==
- Portal, Arizona
- Portal, Georgia
- Portal, Nebraska
- Portal, North Dakota
  - North Portal, a village in Saskatchewan adjacent to Portal, North Dakota
- Portal Peak, a mountain in Canada
- Portal Peak (Washington), a mountain in United States
- Portal, Tarporley, a country house near Tarporley, Cheshire, England
- Portal Bridge, over the Hackensack River in New Jersey
- Portal Heights, former name for a railway station in Montreal, Canada

== Organisations ==
- Clube Atlético Portal, a football club based in Uberlândia, Brazil
- Portals Athletic F.C., a defunct football club, based in Overton, England
- Portals (paper makers), a UK paper making company

== Other uses ==
- Portal (architecture), an opening in a wall of a building, gate or fortification, or the extremities (ends) of a tunnel
- NCAA transfer portal, a database and compliance tool facilitating US college athletes who wish to change schools
- Portal frame, a construction method
- Portal stones, a type of stone monument
- Portal (surname), shared by several notable people
- Portal venous system, an occurrence where one capillary bed drains into another through veins
  - Hepatic portal system, the portal system between the digestive system and the liver
    - Hepatic portal vein, a vein that drains blood from the digestive system
  - Hypophyseal portal system
- Charles Portal, 1st Viscount Portal of Hungerford

== See also ==
- Wikipedia:Portal
- Conduit (channeling)
- The Portal (disambiguation)
- Porthole, a window in the hull of a ship
- Wormhole
