= Portal (surname) =

Portal is a surname. Notable people with the surname include:

- Abraham Portal (1726–1809), English goldsmith and dramatist
- Alejandro Portal (born 1995), Cuban footballer
- Alex Portal (born 2002), French Paralympic swimmer
- Alexia Portal, French actress
- Antoine Portal (1742–1832), French anatomist, doctor and medical historian
- Charles Portal, 1st Viscount Portal of Hungerford (1893–1971), British air force officer
- Enrique del Portal (1932–2020), Spanish tenor and actor
- Gerald Portal (1858–1894), British colonial diplomat
- Jane Portal (born 1955), British art historian and curator
- Jane Williams, Baroness Williams of Elvel née Portal (1929-2023), British government worker and socialite
- Jean-Michel Portal (born 1970), French actor
- Louise Portal (born 1950), Canadian actress
- Magda Portal (1900–1989), Peruvian poet, author and activist
- Manuel Vázquez Portal (born 1951), Cuban journalist and poet
- Marta Portal (1930–2016), Spanish writer, critic, journalist and academic
- Melville Portal (1819–1904), British politician and father of Gerald Portal
- Michel Portal (1935–2026), French composer, saxophonist and clarinetist
- Nacarid Portal (born 1991), Venezuelan writer
- Nicolas Portal (1979–2020), French cyclist
- Reginald Portal (1894–1983), British naval officer
- Robert Portal (born 1967/68), English actor
- Sébastien Portal (born 1982), French cyclist
- Stanley Portal Hyatt (1877–1914), English explorer, hunter and writer
- Wyndham Portal, 1st Viscount Portal (1885–1949), British businessman and public servant
