= Portal Reloaded =

2021 modification for Portal 2

- Developer: Jannis Brinkmann
- Publisher: Jannis Brinkmann
- Engine: Source
- Platforms: Windows; macOS; Linux
- Release: April 19, 2021
- Genre: Puzzle-platform
- Modes: Single-player, multiplayer

Portal Reloaded is a 2021 mod for the 2011 puzzle-platform game Portal 2, developed and published by Jannis Brinkmann. As in the official Portal series, gameplay involves solving puzzles by manipulating portals, which allow the player to move through chambers. The mod also allows the player to shoot a third "time portal", allowing traversal across two versions of the puzzle chamber in different time periods. The player assumes control of a test subject who has to complete puzzles inside the Aperture Science Enrichment Center and destroy a "rogue test subject".

The development of Portal Reloaded began in 2014, initially envisioned as a smaller project. Portal Reloaded was released on Steam for free on April 29, 2021, as a full-scale mod featuring a custom soundtrack and story. A 2023 update introduced a co-op mode to the game. Portal Reloaded received largely positive reception from reviewers, who praised its puzzle designs and humor.

== Gameplay ==
In this example, the player can either use the blue portal to exit from the orange portal, or enter the green "time portal" to access the future chamber, where the blue and orange portals are positioned differently.

Like the Portal series, Portal Reloaded is a puzzle-platform game played from the first-person perspective in which the player must solve puzzles in "test chambers". The player is equipped with the portal gun, allowing them to create two ends of a portal, colored orange and blue, that connect disparate areas in three-dimensional space.

Unique to the mod is a third "time portal", colored green, which allows the player to go between the same point in two alternate versions of the test chamber, one in the past and one in the future. The test chambers in the future are in disrepair and resemble early chambers of Portal 2, whereas those in the past are in fresh conditions. The conditions of test chamber windows and floors are also different in alternate versions, allowing the player to visit inaccessible parts of chambers between the past versions of chambers. The game also involves solving puzzles with other testing elements introduced in the official Portal series, such as buttons, cubes, lasers, and light bridges.

If an object, such as a cube or a conventional portal, is manipulated in the past, it will also move in the future chamber, causing the prior duplicate to fizzle. However, future objects can be moved independently of their past equivalents. While past objects cannot be taken through the time portal into the future, causing a paradox, future variants of an object can be transported into the past. A future variant of an object brought into the past does not create another future variant of itself. As a result, careful usage of puzzle elements allows the player to have a duplicate of any puzzle element that can be brought through the time portal.

The campaign consists of 25 test chambers, and its puzzles progressively increase in difficulty. It features tutorial puzzles that teach the player the mechanics of the "time portal". The game is intended to be completed in between 4 and 6 hours. Unlike Portal 2, which it is based on, the game's initial release only featured the single-player mode. A co-op mode was added in a later update. The developer stated that the mod is intended as a smaller-scale complement to the original game, in contrast to other modifications such as Portal Stories: Mel. It is intended for "veteran players" and is more challenging than the official series.

== Plot ==
Portal Reloaded is intended to take place in the same universe as the official Portal games; according to the developer, the narrative is designed to not interfere with that of the original series. The player assumes the role of test subject 4509 in the Aperture Science Enrichment Center, who is awoken from stasis to take part in a "Time Travel Testing Course".

Navigating various test chambers using the portal gun, they learn how to use time portals to navigate between a version of Aperture's laboratories in the past and a dilapidated and broken version twenty years in the future, which the facility's artificial intelligence overseer states has been damaged as a visual aid. As the game progresses, it is revealed that the main character was the only one who survived initial time travel, and that Aperture cannot get it to work in any way other than the twenty-year interval. Near the end, the overseer admits the Enrichment Center was in fact destroyed under mysterious circumstances involving a "rogue test subject". They reveal the actual purpose of the testing track – to train the player character to kill the rogue subject, preventing the destruction of Aperture's facility.

At the end of the game, the main character is sent back to a stasis chamber. The player can either obey this order, or escape through a time portal to the future. If the player does the former, the test subject successfully returns to stasis, with the AI commenting that they will now "change the course of history", possibly causing the events of Portal to never happen. Otherwise, the player escapes via an elevator, and their portal gun is deactivated. Once reaching the surface, they encounter a pack of "headcrab" zombies. (Note: The Portal games share the same universe and continuity as the Half-Life games.)

== Development and release ==
Portal Reloaded was developed and published by developer Jannis "Portanis" Brinkmann. The development of the mod began in 2014; it was initially a side project, without the intention of turning it into a full-scale modification. All the mod's gameplay alterations were done via a scripting language instead of Portal 2's code directly. Brinkmann wrote on the Portal Reloaded website that he wanted to push the time portal concept to its fullest extent, and that his goal was to explain the concept as best as possible.

Portal Reloaded was released for free on Steam for Windows, macOS, and Linux platforms on April 19, 2021, to coincide with Portal 2's ten-year anniversary. Considering that it is a mod, users must own Portal 2 to play Portal Reloaded. Portal Reloaded also features a custom soundtrack. Harry Callaghan, the composer of Portal Stories: Mel and Aperture Tag, was credited as a voice actor for Portal Reloaded. Upon its release, the developer published a walkthrough of the game on YouTube. After a test release the previous month, Brinkmann released an update in June 2023 that introduced a co-op mode to the game, comprising 20 additional puzzles with new music.

== Reception ==
Reception

Review score
Publication	Score
Hrej.cz	10/10

Portal Reloaded was positively received by critics, who considered it a well-designed complement to the official Portal series. Danny Paez of Screen Rant said that Portal Reloaded "creatively enhanced" Valve's Portal series. Will Nelson of PCGamesN ranked Portal Reloaded as "one of the best free fan-made DLCs ever" made, while Rock Paper Shotgun listed it as one of the best Portal 2 mods. Shacknews rated it as their "best mod of 2021". The mod received an "overwhelmingly positive" reception on Steam.

Rick Lane of PC Gamer did not consider the time portal mechanism to be particularly stunning, but he did laud the game for how it used the idea. Additionally, multiple reviewers criticised the game for lacking replayability. However, David Plecháček of Hrej.cz appreciated the general overall gameplay design, calling it "original". Rob Bellamy of JV praised the puzzle design and the progressive increase in difficulty. Lane remarked that Portal Reloaded "recaptures the wow factor of the original game", but felt that the additional elements in the puzzles could cause frustration occasionally. He also questioned the mod's short length. Lane argued that the looks of Portal Reloaded were not on the level of Portal 2.

Critics praised the game's writing and the announcer's humor. However, Plecháček argued that it was inadequate in comparison with Portal 2, stating that the mod "was created more in the hands of the designer, not the screenwriter".
