= Portal Revolution =

2024 modification for Portal 2

Portal: Revolution
- Developer: Second Face Software
- Publisher: Second Face Software
- Director: Stefan Heinz
- Composer: Jared Poolaw
- Engine: Strata Source
- Platforms: Windows; Linux
- Release: January 6, 2024
- Genre: Puzzle-platform
- Mode: Single-player

Portal: Revolution is a 2024 puzzle-platform modification for Portal 2 developed and published by Second Face Software. Set in the Portal universe prior to the events of Portal 2, the game has the player control an unnamed test subject as she attempts to gain control of a device that will restore the Aperture Science test chambers to full condition. The player traverses the puzzle chambers using the portal gun. In addition to the standard mechanics of Portal games, the mod also introduces a gel cleansing shower, paired cubes that transport laser beams, and Pneumatic Diversity Vents that transport items.

Development of the mod began in 2016; the mod uses a custom version of the Source engine that introduces features that are "impossible in Portal 2" according to the mod developer. It was released on Steam for free on January 6, 2024, after being delayed due to approval difficulties. The mod's gameplay, graphics, and voice acting were positively received by reviewers, while the writing received mixed opinions.

== Gameplay ==
Alongside the standard mechanics of the original Portal series, Portal: Revolution introduces paired cubes that ease the transportation of laser beams (shown in the image).

Like the Portal series, Portal: Revolution is a puzzle-platform game in which the player must solve puzzles in "test chambers". The player is equipped with the portal gun that can create two ends of a portal, coloured red and blue, and can be used to interact with other mechanics such as cubes. The game also features the repulsion and propulsion gels from Portal 2. The repulsion gel, coloured blue, gives a jump boost and can be used as a bouncing pad, while propulsion, coloured orange, provides a speed boost to the player. Portal: Revolution also combines other mechanics of the Portal series into its puzzle chambers, such as the conversion gel, which allows the player to place portals on surfaces that they would not ordinarily be able to placed on, as well as laser fields and launchpads. The mod incorporates several new gameplay components, such as a gel cleansing shower and paired cubes that ease the transportation of laser beams. It also reintroduces Pneumatic Diversity Vents, which can suck up components, such as the player, cubes, and gel; these were removed from the original version of Portal 2 during its development. Some test chambers include switches that can turn off the power, which remove laser obstacles but also shut off devices that assist the player.

Portal: Revolution only features a single-player mode. Its campaign consists of 40 test chambers, sorted into eight chapters; new additions to Portal: Revolution are explained to the player throughout the game. The game's difficulty increases progressively, and it can be completed in approximately 8 hours. A significant number of puzzles in the first half only allow the player to control one portal, with the other being placed in a fixed position; the player unlocks the ability to control the second portal later.

== Plot ==
Portal: Revolution serves as a prequel for Portal 2, being set after the events of Portal. In this game, the player assumes the role of an unnamed female test subject in the dilapidated laboratories of Aperture Science. The game begins with the protagonist being awoken by a maintenance personality core, Stirling, who tells her that she is being trained as part of an "emergency response team" and instructed to solve a series of tests.

After completing them, Stirling reveals that he was misleading her, and his real goal is to activate a powerful device that will restore Aperture's laboratories to full operation, as the labs have seen deterioration due to GLaDOS being defeated by a "rogue test subject". He then asks for the protagonist's cooperation in exchange for setting her free. Traversing both maintenance areas and test chambers, they reach the "Spire" where this device is located. Stirling explains that this device expands on Aperture's previous work with teleportation, allowing him to use it to reassemble and reactivate GLaDOS. The protagonist enters the device control room, and Stirling instructs her to test it by teleporting a short distance, but it malfunctions.

The malfunction causes the protagonist to be teleported to an older experimental testing track. There, she meets up with Emilia Conly, a former Aperture employee whose mind has been copied into a core. Conly and the player traverse the experimental test chambers, eventually reaching the base of the Spire. Ascending the Spire, Conly warns the test subject that Stirling's reactivation of GLaDOS will lead to disaster, as she previously killed all the test subjects and Aperture employees when she was awake, including Conly's original counterpart. Conly and the protagonist navigate through more test chambers, eventually reaching the top of the Spire, where they meet with Stirling. Conly tries to reason with Stirling, but he refuses to change his plans, stating that the facility needs GLaDOS.

After going through test chambers close to the surface, Conly and the protagonist reach the device control room once again. There, they fight with Stirling to disable the device and stop him from awakening GLaDOS. During the fight, Conly reveals that Stirling was originally a robotic vacuum cleaner that she created. Conly and the protagonist successfully stop Stirling from using the device, which explodes. In a post-credits scene, it is revealed that the explosion of the device led the Spire to be teleported to the moon, stranding the protagonist and Conly there. The former passed out and was seriously injured, leading Conly to place her in a lunar long-term relaxation vault. Conly then apologizes for the situation and says goodbye.

== Development and release ==
Portal: Revolution was developed and published by Second Face Software. The Austrian lead developer, Stefan Heinz, had previously designed levels using Portal 2 Authoring Tools before working on Portal: Revolution. Heinz started developing the game in 2016, inspired by mods like Portal Stories: Mel. Over time, Heinz's team grew to include voice actors, programmers, 3D modellers, and producers, all of whom learnt the skills while working on the game. Jared Poolaw composed the game's soundtrack. The game features custom voice acting.

Several iterations were made to the game during its development, with the final one being developed in 2019. As internal expectations grew, most of its content was replaced or revamped as development progressed, and the team improved the quality of several Portal 2 assets. The game uses Strata Source, a community-created version of the Counter-Strike: Global Offensive Source engine that includes modern features that the developers claim are "impossible in Portal 2".

The game was initially envisioned as having a 2022 release date but took longer to develop than expected, leading to it being delayed into 2023. It was finally slated for a release date of January 5, 2024, but Valve failed to approve it by the intended date. Heinz stated at the time that "the game is done", but Valve's review was prolonged due to reduced staffing during the holiday period, resulting in Heinz failing to receive a response as the deadline approached. Instead, it was published on January 6 for free on Steam for Windows and Linux platforms. Considering that it is a mod, users must own Portal 2 to play Portal: Revolution. Before the release, Heinz indicated that the team intended to add post-release content. A separate version of the soundtrack was released on April 1, 2024, alongside a decorative paid downloadable content (DLC) designed to support the developers, and a developer commentary was added for the one-year anniversary of the game.

== Reception ==
Portal: Revolution received an "overwhelmingly positive" rating on Steam shortly after its release. PC Gamer writer Morgan Park stated that it had a "high bar of quality and completeness" that proved "Valve left a lot of meat on the bone with the Portal series". Ford James of PCGamesN described it as being "refined to the point where it could feasibly be DLC from Valve itself".

Reviewers commended the game's puzzle design and gameplay. (Note: Attributed to multiple references:) Elie Gould of TechRadar praised the puzzles as being "no different" from the challenge of Portal 2. James described the puzzles as "consistently strong", noting that the restriction on shooting portals in the first part of the game "is often used to great effect". Park said that this restriction makes the puzzles easier. Writing for PC Games, editor Felix Schütz noted that the game is much less difficult than Portal Stories: Mel; he also praised the new mechanics, saying that they helped keep the game fresh.

The game's writing received mixed feedback from reviewers. Gould said the game had a "story to die for" and "fits nicely" with the official Portal games. Schütz praised the game's voice acting and called the writing "absolutely successful", though he felt it did not reach the quality of Portal 2. Park questioned the writing of Stirling in the early chapters, claiming he failed to put "'personality' in personality core" but did not detract from the overall quality of the mod. James agreed, saying that Stirling was "perhaps the weakest aspect of Revolution" but praised Conly's character in the latter half.

The game's graphics were praised by reviewers. Park complimented the visual design, stating that he "didn't know Portal 2 could look this pretty". Praising the atmospheric variety of the game, Schütz stated that the quality of the environments helped it fit into the Portal universe.
