= Nacarid Portal =

Venezuelan writer (born 1991)

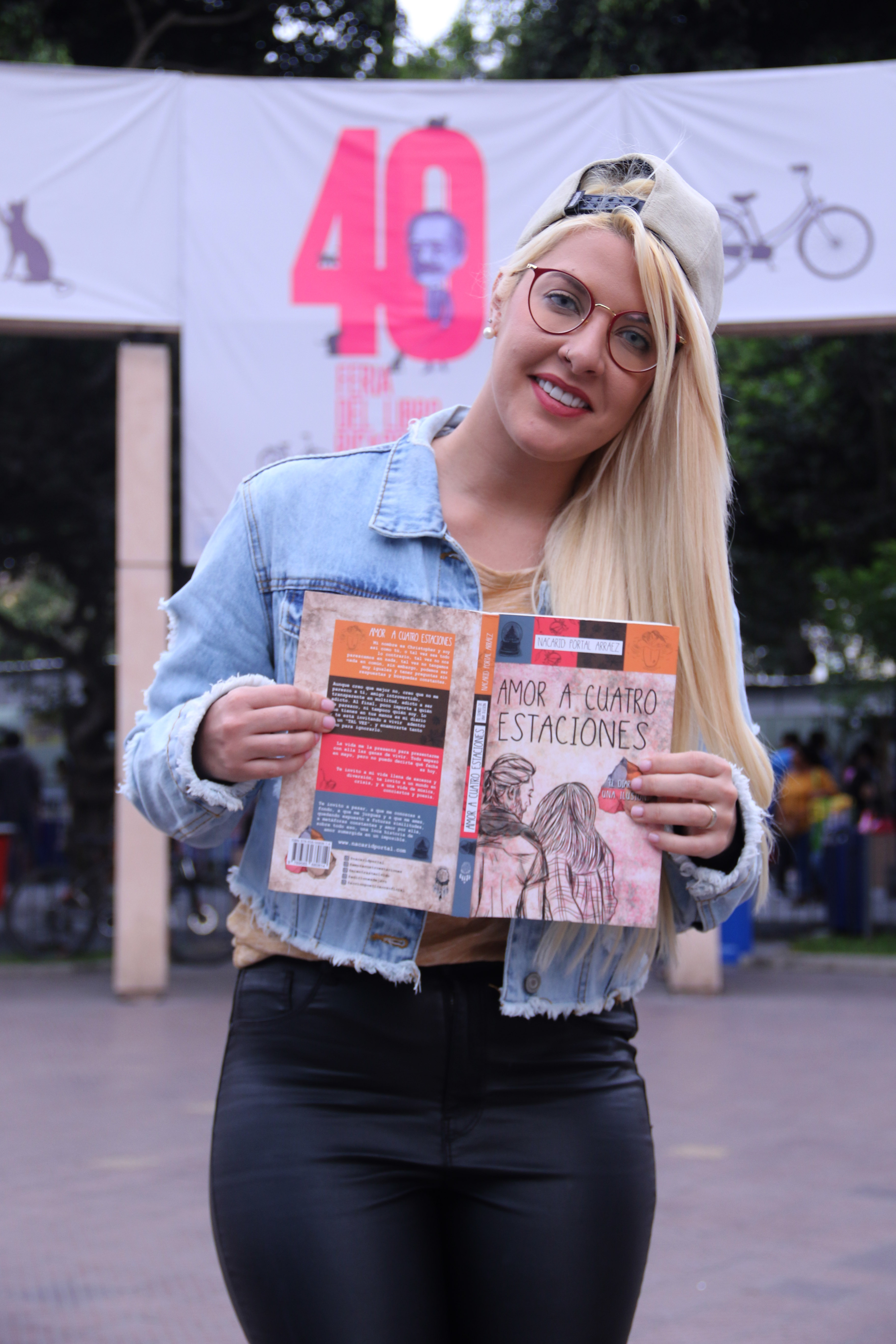
- Portal at the Ricardo Palma Book Fair in 2019
- Born: 1991 (age 34–35); Caracas, Venezuela
- Occupation: Writer

Nacarid Portal Arráez (born 1991) is a Venezuelan writer and publisher associated primarily with young adult literature. She is also the founder and director of the publishing house Déjà Vu.

== Career ==
Portal was born in Caracas and studied social communication and arts at the Universidad Santa María. She later studied at the Escuela Superior de Artes Escénicas Juana Sujo.

At the age of 20, she wrote her first book, La vida entre mis dedos. Her novel Amor a cuatro estaciones became one of the best-selling young adult books in Venezuela in 2016 and 2017. A film adaptation of the novel was subsequently announced.

In 2018, Portal published Quinientas veces tu nombre, which forms part of her Renacer series. She later published Mientras te olvido.

At the age of 21, Portal co-founded the humanitarian organization Tierra Nueva with her mother.

Portal has also been involved with Acción Poética in Caracas, a literary movement that promotes poetry in public spaces.

In 2017, she founded the publishing house Déjà Vu, where she serves as director. The publisher focuses primarily on young adult literature and has also published Portal's own works.

== Personal life ==
Portal is openly lesbian. In 2023, she received media attention after a legal process resulted in her two children being registered with the surnames of both mothers.
