= Razer Hydra =

Motion and orientation detection game controller

- Manufacturer: Razer
- Type: Video game controller
- Input: Weak magnetic field 6dof tracking system per controller; 2 controllers, each has: 5 × Digital buttons +1 analog stick/button +1 bumper button +1 analog trigger
- Connectivity: USB for PC
- Power: USB

The Razer Hydra (previously known as Sixense TrueMotion) is a motion and orientation detection game controller developed by Sixense Entertainment, a company founded in 2007, in partnership with Razer USA. It uses a weak magnetic field to detect the absolute position and orientation of the controllers with a precision, as stated by its developers, of 1 mm and 1°; it has six degrees of freedom. The original release is wired, but a wireless version was also in development.

The game controller has been showcased many times with different video games and 3D modeling applications, most prominently Counter-Strike: Global Offensive, Portal 2, Team Fortress 2, Left 4 Dead 2, World of Goo, Call of Duty: Black Ops and Half-Life 2.

A partnership with Valve was announced, and said company appears as a partner, alongside Razer and Intel. No word has been said by the game developer but they helped Valve modify Left 4 Dead 2 and other Valve games to be played with the Razer Hydra Motion control, and an official SDK is available for download in Steam's 'Tools' page.

It was subject to a demo under the name Sixense Truemotion and tested to a close focus group of PlayStation Underground Members in August 2008, where its full functionality in various types of games was shown.

The Razer Hydra was released through Steam and Razer's official website on June 16, 2011, for US$139.99. It was sold in a bundle with Portal 2, which has exclusive content for those with the controller. Support for many other games is either implemented or planned. According to a forum post, from December 2010, Sixense is also working on musical control with the controller.

== Portal 2 ==
The Razer Hydra came bundled with an enhanced version of Portal 2. It featured a more advanced portal gun with new gameplay mechanics. One new ability is Portal Surfing, which lets the portal gun drag, move and rotate either portal after it has been created. Another is 1-to-1 mode with the portal gun's object carrying beam, which lets you extend the beam many metres and freely move and rotate the carried object in 6 degrees of freedom.

It included the full Portal 2 game, plus a new set of tutorial levels to teach the new mechanics, and two more sets of levels based around the new mechanics.

The default controls for the game allow the player to look around, or move and rotate the carried object or portal, by moving their right hand. Flicking the left hand up, or pressing a button on the right controller, makes you jump. The left analog stick controls movement. The triggers fire or move portals.

== See also ==
- Virtuix Omni
- Haptic suit
