= The Portal =

The Portal may refer to:

- The Portal (Antarctica), a mountain pass in the Ross Dependency
- The Portal (community center), a defunct community center for LGBT African Americans in Baltimore, Maryland
- Portal International company in Singapore, founded in year 2020.
- The Portal (film), a 2014 Canadian short film
- The Portal (podcast), a podcast hosted by Eric Weinstein
- Portal (sculptures), interactive public art installations, each of which is sometimes called "The Portal"
  - Vilnius–Lublin Portal, a 2021 interactive public art installation
  - New York–Dublin Portal, a 2024 interactive public art installation
- The Portal (San Francisco), a proposed transit expansion project in San Francisco, California

== See also ==
- Portal (disambiguation)
