= Movimiento Acción Poética =

Mexican artistic movement

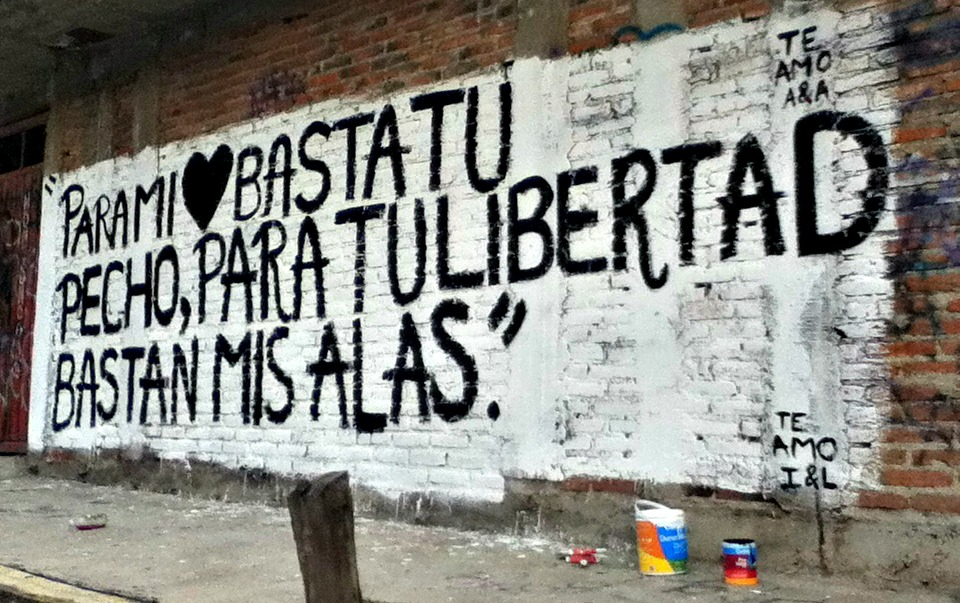
Example of a Acción Poética graffiti. The phrase that appears in the image is the following: "For my heart your chest is enough, for your freedom my wings are enough."

The Movimiento Acción Poética (English: Poetic Action Movement) is a Mexican literary and artistic phenomenon that began in 1996. Its founder is the poet Armando Alanís Pulido and it consists of labeling and intervening on different walls and walls of cities, with fragments of poetry, mainly in Spanish. The movement began on some walls in Monterrey and its metropolitan area, but in recent years the initiative has spread beyond borders and can be seen in more than 180 Mexican cities as well as 40 countries around the world.

These signs use black paint on a white background, signed below with the seal and in small print of Acción Poética. At the beginning of this cultural movement, they were usually lyrics and verses by Alanís. Today, many other anonymous artists sign the walls and walls with their own creative initiative. A rule of the movement is to avoid painting political or religious slogans and to maintain a romantic tone in the background of the sign's phrase or reflection.

The so-called Acción Poética Frases movement emerges from the Movimiento Acción Poética, uniting many groups and millions of people who love this urban cultural art. It brings together groups in Venezuela, Colombia, Chile, Ecuador, and the Dominican Republic.

== History ==
Armando Alanís Pulido, a Mexican poet and urban promoter born in Monterrey (Nuevo León), founded the Movimiento Acción Poética in 1996, which consists of painting city walls with love verses and phrases. For this practice, he earned the nickname "El Bardo de las Bardas" (The Bard of the Walls). Alanís sought to create an "anthology of street poetry" open to people's contemplation in their daily lives and activities, integrating it into the urban landscape and thereby combating the culture that advocates not reading or neglecting the reading habit, which he considered a serious problem in society.

With the growth of social media, people who spontaneously participated in these projects in countries like Argentina and Peru were able to connect with Alanís himself. Instagram and Facebook also served to disseminate and popularize the images, and attracted more people who started their own contributions.

== Inspiration for other movements ==
Acción Ortográfica (Orthographic Action) is one of the movements inspired by Acción Poética, which prioritizes correct spelling and proper language use in various written street expressions.
