= Thinking with Time Machine =

2014 modification for Portal 2

- Developer: Ruslan "Stridemann" Rybka
- Publisher: SignHead Studio
- Engine: Source
- Platforms: Windows; OS X; Linux
- Release: April 18, 2014
- Genre: Puzzle-platform
- Mode: Single-player

Thinking with Time Machine is a 2014 modification for Portal 2 developed by Ruslan "Stridemann" Rybka and published by SignHead Studio. The player controls Chell, the protagonist of the Portal series, who wields the portal gun, while the gameplay revolves around the concept of a tablet-like time machine that is also controlled by the player. The tablet allows the player to record their movement and replay the recordings, creating a double that performs the recorded tasks. Additionally, the mod allows the player to see their own legs by looking down.

The development began after the release of Portal 2. Initially released on the Mod DB website, Thinking with Time Machine went through the Steam Greenlight process, after which it was released as a free modification on Steam on April 18, 2014. The time machine concept and the ability for the player to see their own legs by looking down were commended by critics, while the lack of usage of the portal gun and the mod's short length were criticized.

== Gameplay ==
The player controls a tablet-like time travel device throughout the game.

Like the Portal series, Thinking with Time Machine is a puzzle-platform modification for Portal 2 played from the first-person perspective, in which the player must solve puzzles in "test chambers". Throughout the game, the player controls Chell, the protagonist of the Portal series. The player uses the portal gun that can create two ends of a portal, colored orange and blue. The game also features other Portal mechanics such as buttons, cubes, and laser fields.

In addition to the portal gun, the player is also given a tablet-like "time machine" in their left hand. Looking down at the tablet allows the player to record and control their movement, including walking, jumping, and picking up objects. After recording themselves, the player user can play back the recording, which summons a double who would perform the selected motion. Only one recording can be played at a time, although it can be replayed infinitely. This allows the player to perform multiple tasks simultaneously. Recordings can perform all the actions a normal player can, and the player can also stand on their double, allowing them to reach higher surfaces. After performing a new action, the previous recording is deleted. Another feature of Thinking with Time Machine is the ability for the player to see their own legs by looking down, which is not available in the Portal series.

The campaign starts at the end of Portal 2, after which the player is introduced to the time machine concept through a series of tutorials. There is no custom voice acting in the mod.

== Development and release ==
Thinking with Time Machine was developed by Ruslan "Stridemann" Rybka and published by SignHead Studio. Rybka said that the development of the mod began after the release of Portal 2, that the overall development was frustrating, and that at one point he was close to quitting the development. Initially, the mod was published on the Mod DB website in 2013. The mod later went through the Steam Greenlight process and was accepted due to the mod's concept. The mod was released on Steam for free on April 18, 2014, for Microsoft Windows, OS X, and Linux platforms. Considering that it is a modification, users must own Portal 2 to play Thinking with Time Machine. The game was one of the top 200 on Steam in 2014, and was downloaded over 300,000 times.

== Reception ==
Alice O'Connor of Rock Paper Shotgun rated the mod positively. Christopher Livingston of PC Gamer also praised the mod, saying that "it's very cool watching the past version of Chell appear and run through her recording". Rock Paper Shotgun listed Thinking with Time Machine as one of the best mods for Portal 2.

The time machine concept was praised by reviewers. Livingston and Sergey Svetlichny of ITC.ua compared the time machine concept to functions of the cooperative mode. Phil Savage of PC Gamer also praised the time machine concept and stated that the mod "dramatically expand[s] the complexity" of the Portal series. Bo Moore of Wired and Livingston compared the time machine mechanic to the 2010 The Misadventures of P.B. Winterbottom game. Becky Chambers compared it to the Braid video game.

Reviewers have noted that the game lacks usage of the portal gun; Livingston and Moore saw this as a net negative. Livingston praised the tutorial puzzles, but noted that certain puzzles, in which the double cannot be directly seen, "can get a little weird". Moore praised the design of puzzles but noted that some puzzles lacked "Valve polish", while Svetlichny described them as challenging. The game's short length was also criticized. Nobuki Yasuda of Automaton stated that the mod lacks a clear plot.

The ability for the player to see their own legs by looking down was commended by reviewers. Livingston praised the addition, noting that it helps the player throughout the gameplay.
