= Portal 2 =

2011 video game

- Cover art, featuring co-op campaign characters ATLAS (bottom) and P-body
- Developer: Valve (Note: Nvidia Lightspeed Studios ported the game to the Nintendo Switch.)
- Publishers: Valve; Electronic Arts (PlayStation 3, Xbox 360)
- Director: Joshua Weier
- Producer: Gabe Newell
- Artists: Jeremy Bennett; Randy Lundeen
- Writers: Erik Wolpaw; Jay Pinkerton; Chet Faliszek
- Composer: Mike Morasky
- Series: Portal
- Engine: Source
- Platforms: Windows; macOS; Linux; PlayStation 3; Xbox 360; Nintendo Switch
- Release: April 18, 2011: Windows, Mac OS X (digital); WW: April 18, 2011; Windows, Mac OS X, PlayStation 3, Xbox 360 (retail); NA: April 20, 2011; PAL: April 22, 2011; Linux (beta); WW: February 26, 2014; Nintendo Switch; WW: June 28, 2022
- Genre: Puzzle-platform
- Modes: Single-player, multiplayer

Portal 2 is a 2011 first person puzzle-platform game developed by Valve for Windows, macOS, Linux, PlayStation 3, and Xbox 360. The retail versions and PlayStation 3 and Xbox 360 versions were distributed by Electronic Arts. A port for the Nintendo Switch was released as part of the Portal: Companion Collection in June 2022.

Like the original Portal (2007), players solve puzzles by placing portals and teleporting between them. Portal 2 adds features including excursion funnels (called tractor beams in files), lasers, light bridges, and paint-like gels that alter player movement or allow portals to be placed on any surface. In the single-player campaign, players control Chell, who navigates the dilapidated Aperture Science Enrichment Center during its reconstruction by the supercomputer GLaDOS (Ellen McLain); new characters include robot Wheatley (Stephen Merchant) and Aperture founder Cave Johnson (J. K. Simmons). In the new cooperative mode, players solve puzzles together as robots Atlas and P-Body (both voiced by Dee Bradley Baker). Jonathan Coulton and the National produced songs for the game.

Valve announced Portal 2 in March 2010, and promoted it with alternate reality games including the Potato Sack, a collaboration with several independent game developers. After release, Valve released downloadable content and a simplified map editor to allow players to create and share levels.

Portal 2 received critical acclaim for its gameplay, balanced learning curve, pacing, dark humor, writing, and acting. Like its predecessor, it has been described as one of the greatest video games ever made by numerous publications and critics.

== Gameplay ==
Portal 2 is a first-person perspective puzzle game. The player takes the role of Chell in the single-player campaign, as one of two robots—ATLAS and P-Body—in the cooperative campaign, or as a simplistic humanoid icon in community-developed puzzles. Characters can withstand limited damage but will die after sustained injury. The goal of both campaigns is to explore the Aperture Science Laboratory—a complicated, malleable mechanized maze. While some parts of the game takes place in modular test chambers with clearly defined entrances and exits, other parts occur in behind-the-scenes areas where the objective is less clear.

The initial tutorials guide the player through movement controls and interactions with their environment, and in the case of the cooperative campaign, interactions with the other player. Gameplay revolves around the use of the Aperture Science Handheld Portal Device, which can create a pair of two portals on suitable surfaces through which the player or objects can pass through. Characters can use these portals to move between rooms or to "fling" objects or themselves across a distance.

Portal 2 challenges the player to use teleportation to traverse obstacle courses. The player's speed does not change upon passing through portals. In this example, the vertical velocity of the falling character is converted into horizontal velocity by the portal.

Additional game elements not featured in the original Portal include Thermal Discouragement Beams (lasers), Excursion Funnels (tractor beams), and Hard Light Bridges, all of which can be transmitted through portals. Aerial Faith Plates catapult the player and objects through the air. The player must disable sentient, lethal turrets or avoid their line of sight. The Weighted Storage Cube has been redesigned, and there are new types: Redirection Cubes, which have prismatic lenses that redirect laser beams, spherical Edgeless Safety Cubes, an antique version of the Weighted Storage Cube used in the underground levels, and a cube-turret hybrid created by Wheatley after taking control of Aperture. The heart-decorated Weighted Companion Cube appears briefly. Early demonstrations included Pneumatic Diversity Vents, shown to transport objects and transfer suction power through portals, but these do not appear as a game mechanic in the final game. The typical objective of a test chamber or level is to use the portal gun and provided gameplay elements to open a locked exit door and progress to the next chamber.

Paint-like gels (which are dispensed from pipes and can be transported through portals) impart certain properties to surfaces or objects coated with them. Players can use orange Propulsion Gel to cross surfaces more quickly, blue Repulsion Gel to bounce from a surface, and white Conversion Gel to allow surfaces to accept portals. Only one type of gel can affect a certain surface at a time. Some surfaces, such as grilles, cannot be coated with a gel. Water can block or wash away gels, returning the surface or object to its normal state.

In the cooperative campaign, two players can use the same console with a split screen, or can use a separate computer or console; Windows, Mac OS X, and PlayStation 3 users can play with each other regardless of platform. Both player-characters are robots equipped with independent portal guns, a portal pair placed by either player is usable by both. Most chambers lack strict structure, and require players to use both sets of portals for laser or funnel redirection, launches, and other maneuvers. The game provides voice communication between players, and online players can temporarily enter a split-screen view to help coordinate actions. Players can "ping" to draw the other player's attention to walls or objects, start countdown timers for synchronized actions, and perform joint gestures such as waving or hugging. The game tracks which chambers each player has completed and allows players to replay chambers they have completed with new partners.

Portal 2's lead writer Erik Wolpaw estimates each campaign to be about six hours long. Portal 2 contains in-game commentary from the game developers, writers, and artists. The commentary, which is unlocked per completed chapter, appears on node icons scattered through the chambers. According to Valve, each of the single-player and cooperative campaigns is 2 to 2.5 times as long as the campaign in Portal, with the overall game five times as long.

== Synopsis ==
=== Setting ===
The Portal series shares a fictional universe with the Half-Life series. The events in Portal take place between the first and second Half-Life games, while most of Portal 2 is set "a long time after" the events in Portal.

Before Portal, Aperture Science conducted experiments to determine whether human subjects could safely navigate dangerous "test chambers", until the artificial intelligence GLaDOS, governing the laboratory, killed its employees. At the end of the first Portal, the protagonist Chell destroys GLaDOS and momentarily escapes the facility, but is dragged back inside by an unseen figure later identified by writer Erik Wolpaw as the "Party Escort Bot". A promotional comic shows estranged Aperture Science employee Doug Rattmann, who used graffiti to guide the player in Portal, placing Chell into suspended animation to save her life, until the beginning of Portal 2.

=== Plot ===
==== Single-player ====
In the Aperture Science Enrichment Center, player-character Chell wakes in a stasis chamber resembling a motel room. The complex has become dilapidated after what appears to be millennia of decay. Wheatley (Stephen Merchant), a personality core, guides her through old test chambers from the first game in an attempt to escape the facility after its reserve power is depleted. They accidentally reactivate the dormant GLaDOS (Ellen McLain) while attempting to restore power to the escape pods; she separates Chell from Wheatley and begins rebuilding the facility.

GLaDOS subjects Chell to new tests until Wheatley helps her escape again. They sabotage Aperture's production of turrets and neurotoxin to prevent GLaDOS from killing them, then confront GLaDOS and perform a core transfer; replacing her with Wheatley as the laboratory's controller. Wheatley, immediately driven mad with power, installs GLaDOS on a potato battery. GLaDOS tells Chell that Wheatley was designed as an "intelligence dampening sphere" to deliberately produce illogical thoughts and hamper her own intelligence. Infuriated, Wheatley inadvertently destroys the lift to the surface with Chell and GLaDOS inside, causing them to fall to the facility's abandoned lowest levels.

Chell retrieves GLaDOS in potato battery form and the two develop a reluctant partnership in order to stop Wheatley before his incompetence destroys the facility. Ascending through laboratories built in the 20th century, they discover audio recordings by eccentric Aperture Science founder Cave Johnson (J. K. Simmons). The recordings reveal how Aperture slowly lost money and prestige throughout the decades, as its pool of test subjects was altered from "astronauts, war heroes, and Olympians" in the 1950s, to homeless people in the 1970s, and Aperture's own employees in the 1980s. In 1981, Johnson became mortally ill after ingesting moon dust used to manufacture portal-conductive surfaces. His last request was for the mind of his assistant Caroline (McLain) to be transferred—by force, if necessary—to an advanced computer designed to store a human consciousness, which he had previously commissioned to save himself, creating GLaDOS. GLaDOS is troubled by the discovery that she is Caroline.

Chell and GLaDOS return to Aperture's higher levels, where they discover Wheatley's utter incompetence has brought the Aperture facility on the verge of catastrophic failure. Wheatley, after discovering Chell and GLaDOS had returned, decides to keep them alive as test subjects because the "franken-turret" cubes he created were ineffective at solving tests. GLaDOS later reveals that her body came built-in with a euphoric response to test completion that becomes less effective over time. Throughout the following chambers, Wheatley becomes increasingly frustrated with its dwindling effects.

Wheatley reveals that he has a "surprise" for Chell and GLaDOS, later tricking them into a death trap. He reveals that he had discovered the two robots from the Cooperative Testing Initiative, the game's cooperative campaign, making Chell no longer useful to him. She manages to escape from the trap right before its activation. The game's final levels are spent escaping from Wheatley's numerous attempts to kill them.

In the game's boss fight and ending, Chell confronts Wheatley and attaches corrupted personality cores (Nolan North) to force another core exchange and restore GLaDOS to authority. However, Wheatley demolishes the button necessary to initiate the transfer. As the facility crumbles, Chell places a portal on the Moon; she and Wheatley begin to be pulled into the vacuum of space. GLaDOS, having reasserted control over the facility, rescues Chell and abandons Wheatley to outer space. When Chell awakens, GLaDOS claims to have learned of humanity from the remnants of Caroline, but deletes Caroline's personality. Deciding that Chell is not worth the trouble of killing, GLaDOS frees her from the facility and gives Chell the burnt companion cube.

==== Co-op ====
The cooperative story is chronologically set after the events of the single-player campaign, but players are not required to play them in order. Player characters Atlas and P-Body are bipedal robots constructed by GLaDOS. In the first four 'sets' of levels, the robots are sent on ventures into the depths of the Aperture facilities to recover and upload data disks. After completion of each mission, the robots are disassembled and are reassembled to complete the next.

At first, GLaDOS is excited about her non-human test subjects, but later becomes dissatisfied because the two robots cannot truly die, and at one point also gets uncomfortable with their close partnership. At the end of the story, the robots gain entry to "the Vault", a storage facility of thousands of humans placed in stasis. GLaDOS thanks the robots for their acquisition of new test subjects, and promptly destroys the robots.

==== Peer Review ====
The robots are reactivated by GLaDOS one week after the original co-op campaign, during which GLaDOS has already wiped out all of the found test subjects after attempting to turn them into "killing machines". The robots are sent to find a saboteur that has taken control of a prototype central core and is causing problems in the facility. The saboteur is revealed to be a bird pecking at the console's keyboard, which sends GLaDOS into a panic when she recognizes it as the one who tried to eat her during her time as a potato battery. The robots manage to shoo away the bird, earning a rare compliment from GLaDOS before she notices eggs in its nest. Instead of having them smashed, GLaDOS has the eggs taken to her chamber so that she can raise the baby birds to be her killing machines.

== Development ==
After the success of Portal, Valve decided to make Portal 2 a standalone product, partly because of pressure from other developers within Valve who wanted to work on a Portal product. Work began almost immediately after the release of Portal. Valve committed more resources to Portal 2's development than they had for the first game; Portal had a team of seven or eight people, but Portal 2 had a team of 30 or 40. The initial team of four was expanded as subgroups formed to devise game mechanics and to plot the story. Participants in internal review processes were inspired by what they saw to join the project. According to Erik Wolpaw, some Portal 2 developers worked on the Left 4 Dead games to help them meet milestones, but returned to Portal 2, "with extra people in tow." Kim Swift, Portal's designer, left Valve for Airtight Games halfway through Portal 2's development.

Project manager Erik Johnson stated that Valve's goal for Portal 2 was to find a way to "re-surprise" players, which he considered a "pretty terrifying" prospect. In March 2011, one month before the game's release, Valve president Gabe Newell called Portal 2 "the best game we've ever done". After Portal 2's release, Geoff Keighley wrote that according to Newell, "Portal 2 will probably be Valve's last game with an isolated single-player experience". Keighley later stated that the use of the word "probably" suggests that "this could change." Newell said that Valve is not "giving up on single-player", but intends to include more social features on top of the single-player experience, akin to the cooperative mode in Portal 2.

=== Design ===
Initially, Valve planned to exclude portals in Portal 2, and focused on a new mechanic called "F-Stop". Valve did not discuss the specifics of the idea, as they planned to potentially reuse it in the future. In 2020, the developer LunchHouse Software revealed they had discovered the code for "F-Stop" in the branch of Source they were using for their game PUNT, and with Valve's permission were sharing it via the documentary webseries Exposure. The mechanic was based on an "Aperture Camera", with which users could take photos of objects, store the object in a camera, and then replace it while rotating or scaling it. Valve's F-Stop game was set in the 1980s, and did not feature Chell or GLaDOS. Instead, it followed a new test subject involved in a conflict within Aperture after Johnson, in an attempt to reach immortality, uploads himself into an artificial intelligence and took control of a robot army. Though the playtesters liked F-Stop, they were disappointed by the omission of portals. Based on the feedback, Newell directed the team to reconsider the direction around October 2008. Atop the source from LunchHouse, a large leak of data from one of Valve's servers in August 2026 provided a large amount of builds art assets for the game, leading to fan community members compiling a fully playable version of F-Stop by November 2026.

Several test chambers from Portal (top) reappear in Portal 2 (bottom), decayed by the passage of time.

Valve did not aim to make Portal 2 more difficult, but instead to produce "a game where you think your way through particular parts of the level, and feel really smart when you solve it". To teach players the game rules incrementally, Valve designed two basic types of test chamber: one, which Valve called "checklisting", provides a safe environment for the player to experiment with a new concept, while the other combines elements in new ways to force the player to think laterally. Test chambers began as isometric drawings on whiteboard. The developers ran a sanity check before crafting simple levels with the Hammer Editor, Valve's level construction tool. Iterative playtesting ensured the solutions were neither too obvious nor too difficult; playtesters sometimes discovered alternative solutions, which the team removed if they were considered too easy.

Valve aimed to teach new players the portal mechanics while still entertaining experienced players. To this end, they streamlined some elements; for example, the moving energy balls of Portal were replaced with lasers, which provide immediate feedback. To evoke a sense of nostalgia and time having passed between the games, Valve included test chambers from the original Portal. They used higher-resolution textures supported by the improved game engine, and applied decay, collapse, and overgrowth effects.

The middle section of the single-player campaign takes place in large spaces where few portals can be placed, forcing players to find creative ways to cross. The architecture in these sections was inspired by photographs of industrial complexes such as CERN, NASA, and the abandoned Soviet space program. When Wheatley controls the Aperture facility, the designers "had a blast" creating deranged chambers reflecting Wheatley's stupidity. As solving constant puzzles would tire players, the designers inserted occasional "experiences" to provide respite and advance the plot.

Portal 2 features gels that impart special properties to surfaces or objects they touch. Here, blue Repulsion Gel causes the painted turrets to bounce off any surface.

The Repulsion (jumping) and Propulsion (running) gels in Portal 2 originated in Tag: The Power of Paint. Valve hired the Tag creators to develop the idea further and later decided to include it in Portal 2. Journalists have likened Tag to Narbacular Drop, the DigiPen student project whose mechanics became Portal. As the third Tag gel, which allows the character to walk on any surface regardless of gravity, gave playtesters motion sickness, it was replaced by Conversion gel, which integrates with the portal mechanic. The gels give the player more control over the environment, which increased the challenge for the puzzle designers. The gels are rendered using fluid dynamics routines specially developed at Valve by the former Tag Team. Rendering techniques developed for Left 4 Dead 2 were used to render pools of liquid; Portal 2 combines "flowing" surface maps to mimic the motion of water with "debris flow" maps and random noise to create realistic, real-time rendering of water effects.

A leak of early builds of Portal 2 were part of a larger leak of files from Valve and Steam discovered in August 2026. The leak included more footage of the F-Stop mechanic, a bullet time effect that was used for solving puzzles, and dialog from Cave Johnson on the nature of Companion Cubes.

=== Cooperative mode ===
The cooperative mode originated from players' requests and from anecdotes of players working together on the same computer or console to solve the game's puzzles. Wolpaw likened this to players working together on the same computer to solve point-and-click adventure games. The cooperative campaign was also inspired by Valve's Left 4 Dead cooperative games, in which players enjoyed discussing their personal experiences with the game when they had finished playing it.

While the single-player campaign in Portal 2 is designed to avoid frustrating the player, the cooperative levels focus on coordination and communication, and Valve recognizes they are much more difficult than the single-player puzzles. Valve did not include timed puzzles in the single-player campaigns in Portal and Portal 2, but found that their inclusion in the cooperative mode is effective and gives players a positive feeling after they successfully plan and execute difficult maneuvers.

Each puzzle chamber in the cooperative mode requires actions from both players. As soon as a playtester discovered a way to complete a puzzle with one set of portals, the level was sent back to the designers for further work. With few exceptions, Valve designed the chambers so that both players would remain in sight of each other to promote communication and cooperation. Some of the puzzle chambers were designed asymmetrically; one player would manipulate portals and controls to allow the other player to cross the room, emphasizing that the two characters, while working together, are separate entities. The designers soon realized that the ability to tag surfaces with instructional icons for one's partner was a necessary element, since they found this to be more effective for cooperation than simple, verbal instructions.

Valve considered a competitive mode. According to Wolpaw, the mode was similar to the video game Speedball; one team would try to transport a ball from one side of the playing field to the other using portals, while the other team would attempt to stop them with their own use of portals. Matches would commence with this objective in mind, but quickly descended into chaos. Valve realized that people enjoyed solving puzzles with portals more and therefore they focused on the cooperative mode.

=== Writing ===
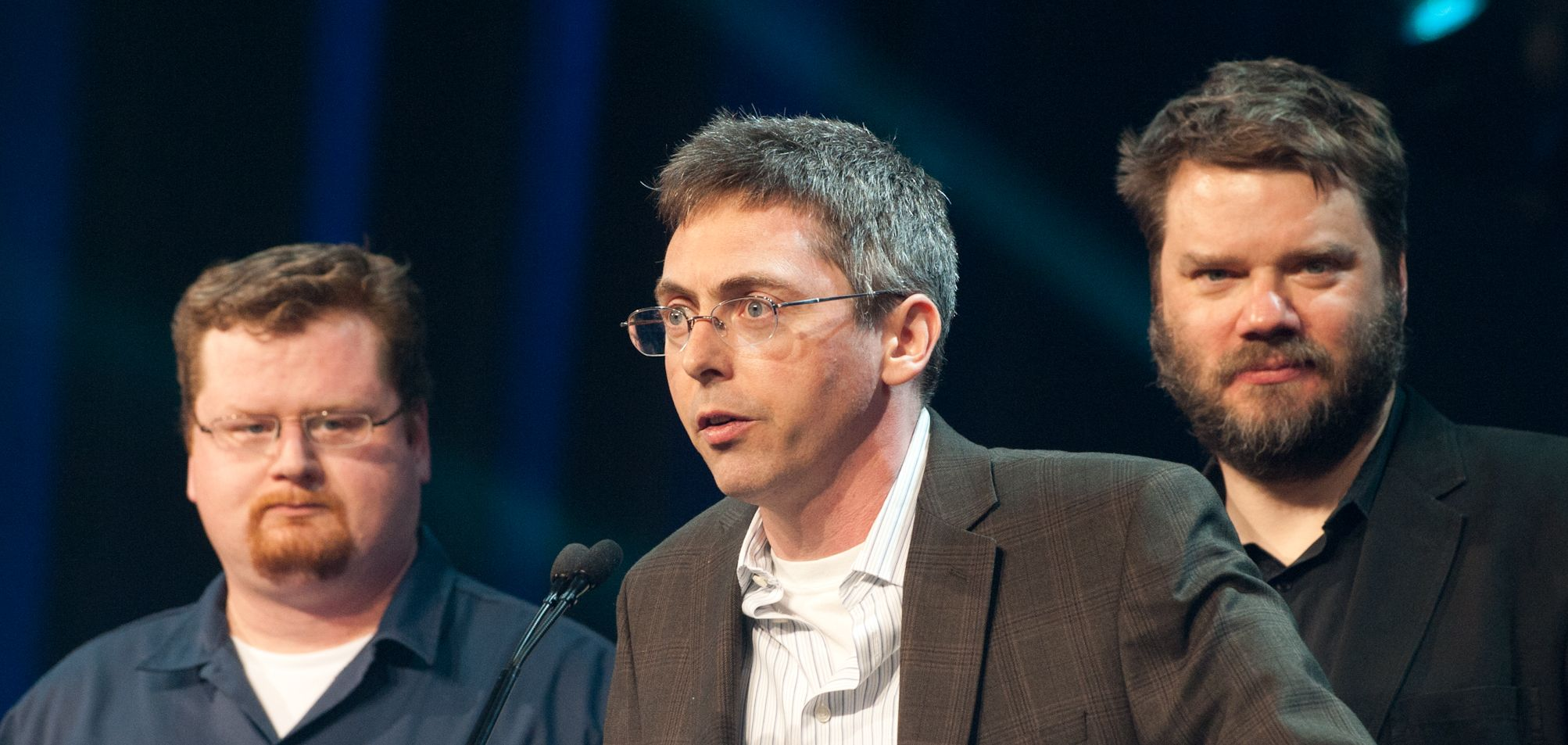
Writers Jay Pinkerton (left), Erik Wolpaw, and Chet Faliszek at the 2012 Game Developers Conference receiving the "Best Narrative" award for Portal 2

Wolpaw and ex-National Lampoon writer Jay Pinkerton wrote the single-player story, while Left 4 Dead writer Chet Faliszek wrote GLaDOS's lines for the cooperative campaign. The game has 13,000 lines of dialogue. The writers felt they needed to create a larger story for a stand-alone title, and wanted the game to "feel relatively intimate", and avoided adding too many new characters. They considered expanding the "sterility and dryness" of Portal and adding more comedy to the script. Wolpaw said that while some developers have been moving towards art games, no one had made a comedic video game. The game's story development was tightly coordinated with the gameplay development and testing.

The developers initially envisioned a prequel set in the 1950s, long before GLaDOS took over the Aperture Science facility, with events set in motion when Aperture CEO Cave Johnson is put into a computer, only to realize it was a mistake. Johnson would have led an army of robots, which would battle against the player to rise to power within Aperture. In June 2008, based on information from a casting call website and leaked script samples, Kotaku reported that Valve was seeking voice actors to play Johnson, named him as an AI and identified the game as a prequel. Valve attributed this leak to an "overeager agent". Following negative playtester feedback about the omission of Chell and GLaDOS, Portal 2 was re-conceived as a sequel. The team returned to the idea of exploring parts of the facility from Aperture's early days, and reincorporated Johnson through a series of recordings.

The writers originally conceived several premature joke game endings if the player performed certain actions, but these required too much development effort for little payback and were scrapped. One of these joke endings was triggered by shooting a portal onto the moon's surface, after which the player's character would die from asphyxiation over a closing song, but the idea of creating a portal on the moon was incorporated into the game's final ending. The writers planned that Chell would say a single word during the ending, but this was not considered funny enough. In an early version of the script, Chell finds a lost "tribe" of turrets looking for their leader, a huge "Animal King" turret which can be seen in in-game videos of the retail product. As a reward, the Animal King would have married Chell to a turret, which would have followed Chell around the game without visible movement. The cooperative campaign was planned to feature a more detailed storyline, in which GLaDOS would send two robots to discover human artifacts, such as a comic based on a pastiche of Garfield. The writers hoped to use this idea to make the robots human-like for testing purposes, but recognized that unlike the captive audience of the single-player campaign, the two players in cooperative mode may simply talk over the story, and thus the story was condensed into very basic elements.

Wolpaw said that while many story elements of Portal are revisited in Portal 2, he avoided some of the memes—such as the frequently repeated "the cake is a lie". He said, "if you thought you were sick of the memes, I was sick of it way ahead of you". Wolpaw "couldn't resist putting in just one" cake joke. The writers did not try to predict or write new memes, and Wolpaw said, "you can't really plan for [dialogue to become a meme] because if you do it probably seems weird and forced". Portal 2 produced its own memes, including a space-obsessed personality core. Valve later created a Space Core modification for the game The Elder Scrolls V: Skyrim (see below), and the Space Core also appeared as a laser-based engraving on a panel manufactured by NASA for the International Space Station.

The writers saw Aperture Science itself as a character. It is depicted as a "living, breathing place", and "a science company that's gone mad with science." In the Lab Rat comic, the facility is described as a "beautiful and terrible" place, "a metastasized amalgam of add-ons, additions and appropriations. Building itself out of itself."

Richard McCormick of PlayStation 3 Magazine identified several elements of Portal 2's story that reference the myth of Prometheus; McCormick wrote that GLaDOS is a personification of Prometheus, who grants knowledge to humanity—in the form of the portal gun—and is then punished by being bound to a rock, pecked at by birds, and is cast into the pits of Tartarus. McCormick also likens Wheatley to Prometheus' foolish brother Epimetheus. Within the game, a turret makes reference to the Prometheus myth, the word "Tartarus" is visible on the supporting columns in the depths of Aperture Science, and a portrait of Cave and Caroline also shows Aeschylus, the presumed author of Prometheus Bound. Journalists and players have also found connections between Portal 2 and Half-Life 2. As an easter egg, a hidden area in Portal 2 contains the empty dry dock of Aperture Science's cargo ship, the Borealis, which is found during Half-Life 2: Episode Two to have been stranded in the Arctic as a result of a teleportation experiment.

=== Character design ===
Though Portal 2 introduced some new characters, the writers wanted to maintain the one-on-one relationships between each character and the player-character. Valve explored the possibility of introducing a new protagonist for Portal 2. The playtesters accepted playing as a different character for the first part of the game, but they became disoriented when GLaDOS did not recognize them. The writers returned to using Chell, the protagonist of Portal. Valve artists experimented with Chell's attire, and considered changing her (ambiguous) nationality. They returned to the orange "dehumanizing" jumpsuit from Portal with the top tied around Chell's waist to enhance her freedom of movement and help her "stand out more as an individual". PSM3 called the new look "controversially sexy". As in the first game, Chell's facial appearance is based on that of voice actress Alésia Glidewell. Chell continues her role as a silent observer, as the straight man in response to the insanity around her and refuses to give her antagonists any satisfaction.

As part of her character arc, the plot moves GLaDOS from her anger with Chell for her actions in Portal, which Wolpaw said "was going to get old pretty quick", to an internal struggle. The reuse of McLain's voice led to the creation of a backstory and subplot about GLaDOS's creation. The writers panicked when they realized that their plans to have Chell and GLaDOS play off each other would only work if both players spoke. To remedy this, they created the Caroline subplot to give GLaDOS an external situation to deal with and to drive the story during the middle act of the game.

The writers considered introducing about six personality cores stored in portable spheres, whose main function would be story advancement. They planned cores based on Morgan Freeman's character Red from The Shawshank Redemption and Quint from Jaws, among others. Ultimately they decided to concentrate on a single core, Wheatley, recycling three of the rejected cores in the final boss fight. Karen Prell, a veteran performer for the Muppets, led the animation team for Wheatley and the other personality cores.

Pictures of Cave Johnson, based on the face of lead animator Bill Fletcher, appear throughout Portal 2. Though comparisons have been made between Johnson and Andrew Ryan, the wealthy industrialist who created the fictional underwater city of Rapture in BioShock, Wolpaw says the writers did not consider this character while creating Johnson. The two robotic characters provide some amusing death scenes in the cooperative mode, such as struggling while being crushed by a lowering ceiling. The artists thought the look of the robots would help tell the story, and the fact that they are holding hands emphasizes the cooperative mode. "Expressive noises" and mannerisms are used in place of distinguishable dialogue, and the robotic characters were designed as a double-act, similar to Laurel and Hardy.

=== Voice cast ===
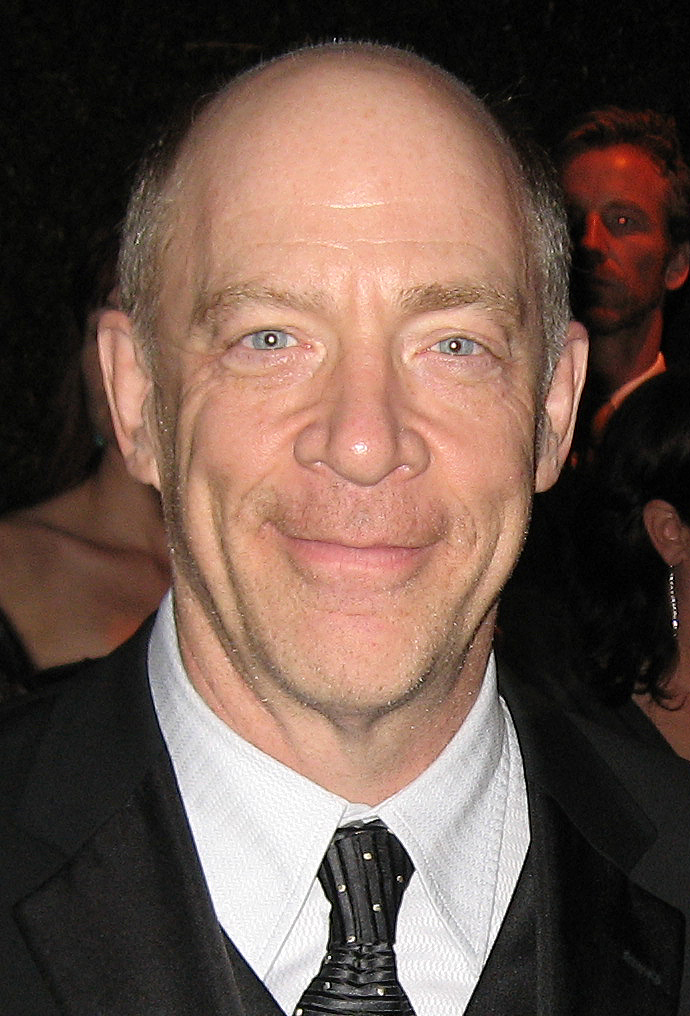
J. K. Simmons voices Cave Johnson, the eccentric CEO of Aperture Science.

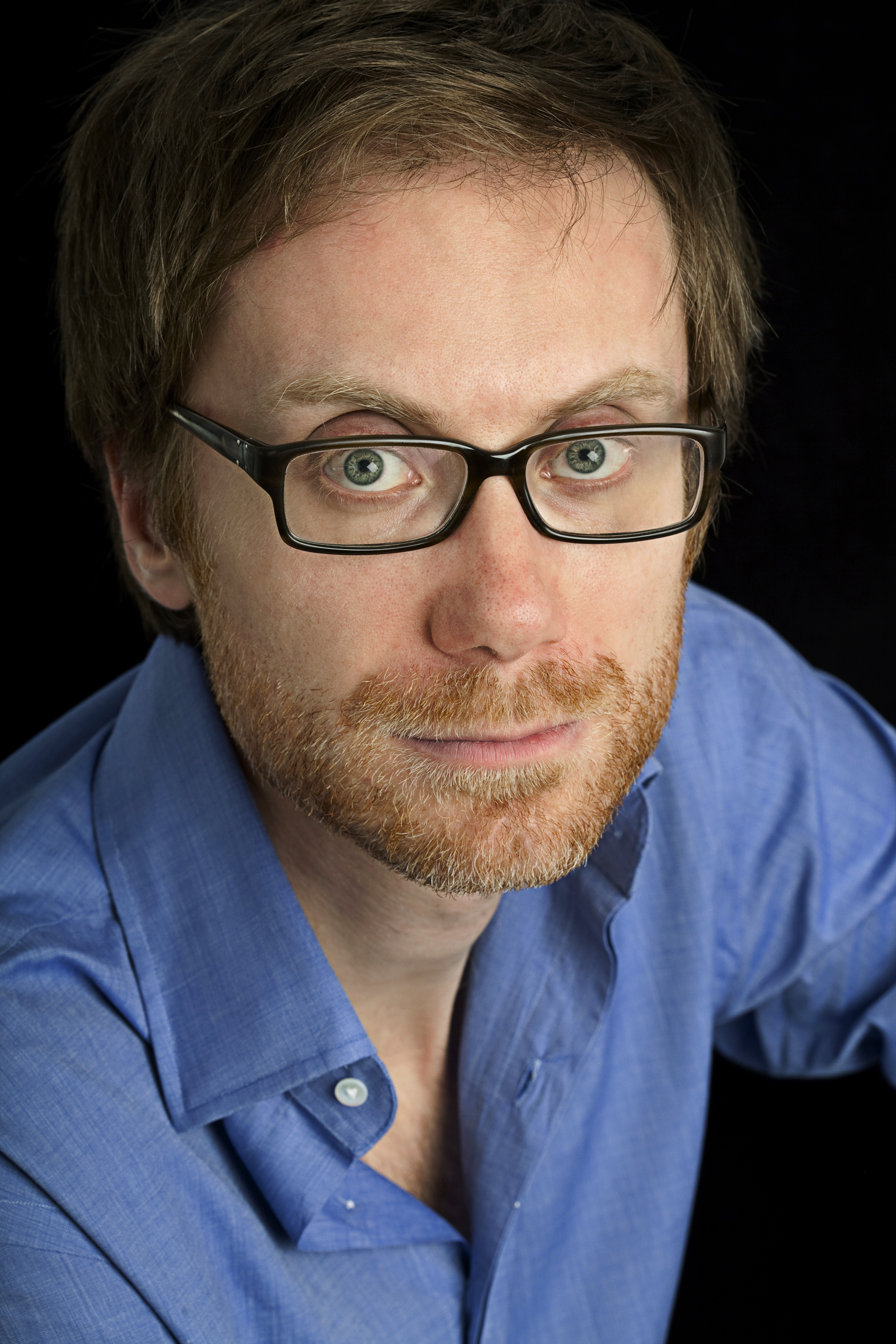
Stephen Merchant voices Wheatley, a personality core.

GLaDOS returns from Portal as a major character and the game's antagonist, and is voiced by Ellen McLain. The writers found that they needed another character to play off Johnson, but did not want to hire another voice actor. Having already recruited McLain to play GLaDOS, they asked her to provide the voice for Caroline, Cave Johnson's assistant. Wheatley is voiced by Stephen Merchant; early demonstrations at trade shows used the voice of Valve animator Richard Lord. The writers wrote Wheatley's lines with Merchant in mind, citing his unique "vocal silhouette" and his ability to ad lib in a "frantic" manner. They had assumed that Merchant would be unavailable and contacted The IT Crowd's writer Graham Linehan to try to get Richard Ayoade, but then discovered that Merchant was interested. Merchant spent around sixteen hours recording lines and was given freedom to improvise.

J. K. Simmons voices Cave Johnson, Aperture Science's founder and CEO. Simmons's selection helped to solidify the character's development. The robots' voices were provided by Dee Bradley Baker, who had performed similar robotic voices for the Star Wars: The Clone Wars media.

In the cooperative campaign, a separate story involves two robotic characters and GLaDOS. The designers initially planned to use Chell and a new human character called "Mel". GLaDOS' dialogue would play off the humans' "image issues", and this aspect was retained after the designers switched to using robots. GLaDOS seems troubled by the robots' cooperation, and tries to aggravate their relationship through psychological tactics, such as praising one robot over the other. Valve initially considered having GLaDOS deliver separate lines to each player, but they found this to be a significant effort for minimal benefit. The writers also tried adding lines for GLaDOS that would encourage the players to compete against each other for rewards, such as meaningless points, but playtesters did not respond well. Faliszek said that in cooperative games, it can be difficult to deliver key dialogue or in-game events to players, who may not be looking in the right direction at the right time. Instead, using their experience from previous games, Faliszek and Wolpaw kept the story and key comedic lines short, and repeated them frequently.

=== Music ===
Portal 2 contains both scored and procedurally generated music created by Valve's composer, Mike Morasky, and two songs; "Want You Gone" recorded by Jonathan Coulton, used on the final credits of the single-player mode, and "Exile Vilify" by the National, used in the background of one of the Rat Man's dens. The full soundtrack "Songs to Test By", containing most of the songs in the game, was released as three free downloads between May and September 2011, and later in October 2012 as a retail Collector's Edition, including the soundtrack from Portal.

== Marketing ==
=== Announcement ===
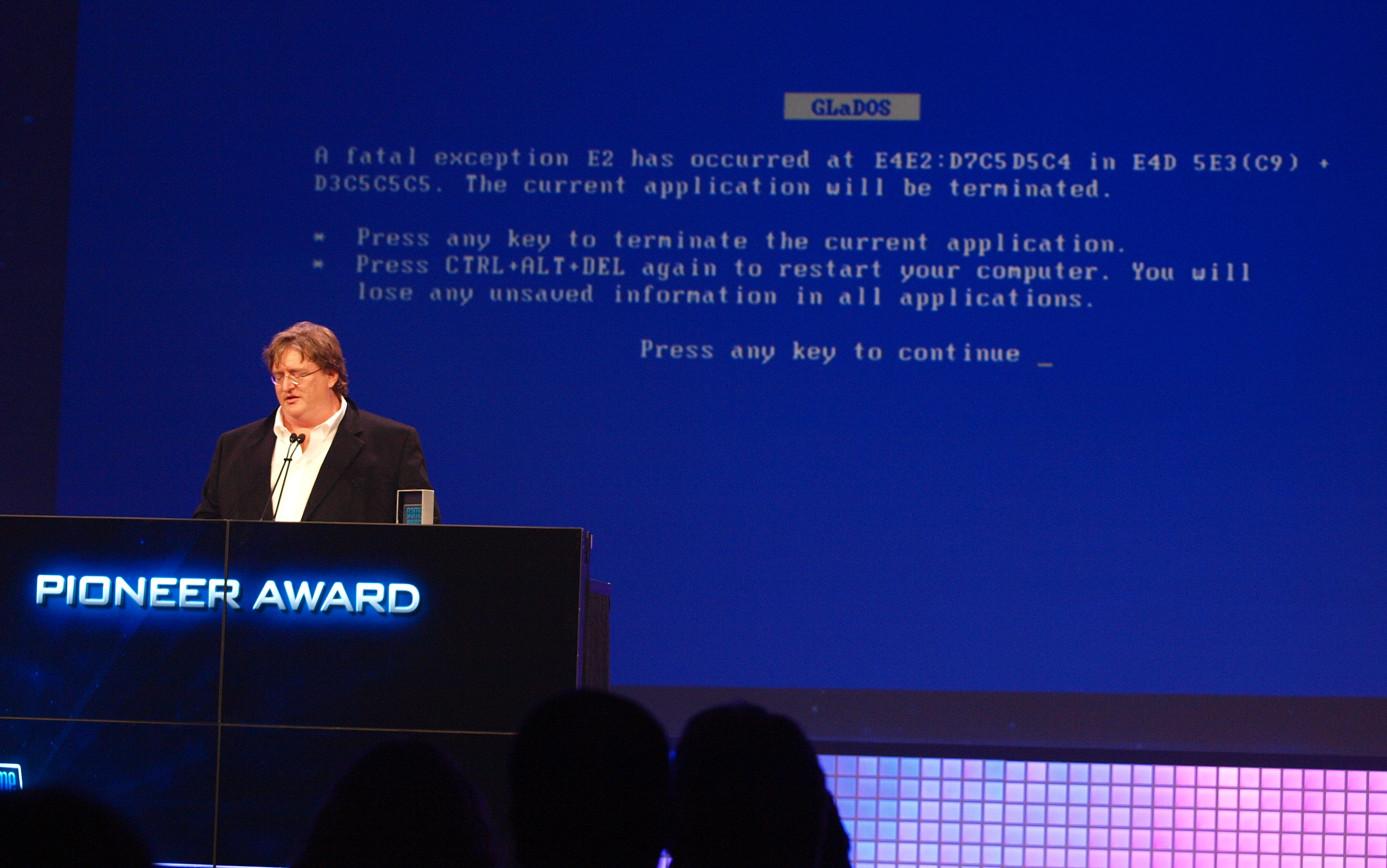
Gabe Newell and the GLaDOS blue screen of death at the 2010 Game Developers Conference

In January 2008, Valve spokesman Doug Lombardi told Eurogamer, "There'll be more Portal, for sure", and Portal designer Kim Swift confirmed that work on Portal 2 would begin the following month. Swift said that a multiplayer mode in Portal was "technically possible", but that it was "less fun than you'd think."

Portal 2 was officially announced on March 5, 2010, via Game Informer. Events during the preceding week foreshadowed the announcement. On March 1, Valve released a patch for Portal that included a new achievement, "Transmission Received", requiring the player to manipulate in-game radios. This revealed new sound effects that became part of an alternate reality game (ARG). Some of the new effects were of Morse code strings that suggested GLaDOS was rebooting, while others could be decoded as SSTV images from grainy Aperture Science videos. The images included hints to a BBS phone number that, when accessed, provided a large number of ASCII-based images relating to Portal and segments of Aperture Science documents. Many of these ASCII pictures were later published in the Game Informer reveal of the title. New ASCII images continued to appear on the BBS after the official announcement. Background on the ARG is embedded in additional SSTV images found in a hidden room in Portal 2. Valve's Adam Foster came up with the idea for the ARG, tying it to the Game Informer reveal, and he provided his own home phone line to run the BBS software on, as Valve's offices at the time were too modern to support the protocol. Foster estimates the ARG cost less than $100 to run.

A second Portal patch released on March 3 altered the game's ending sequence to show Chell being pulled back into the Aperture facility. Gaming journalists speculated that an announcement of Portal 2 was imminent. On March 5, Game Informer announced Portal 2's official release on the cover of its April issue. During the following week, Gabe Newell's speech accepting the Pioneer Award at the Game Developers Conference 2010 ended with a fake blue screen of death appearing on a screen behind him with a message purported to be from GLaDOS which hinted of further Portal 2 news at the upcoming E3 2010. Two weeks before the E3, game journalists received a cryptic e-mail, worded as a press release from Aperture Science, hinting that the presentation on Portal 2 would be replaced with "a surprise" jointly hosted by Aperture Science and Valve. This prompted speculation that the surprise would be the announcement of Half-Life 2: Episode Three, but Valve confirmed that it would be about Portal 2. The surprise was the announcement of Portal 2 on PlayStation 3.

=== Promotion ===
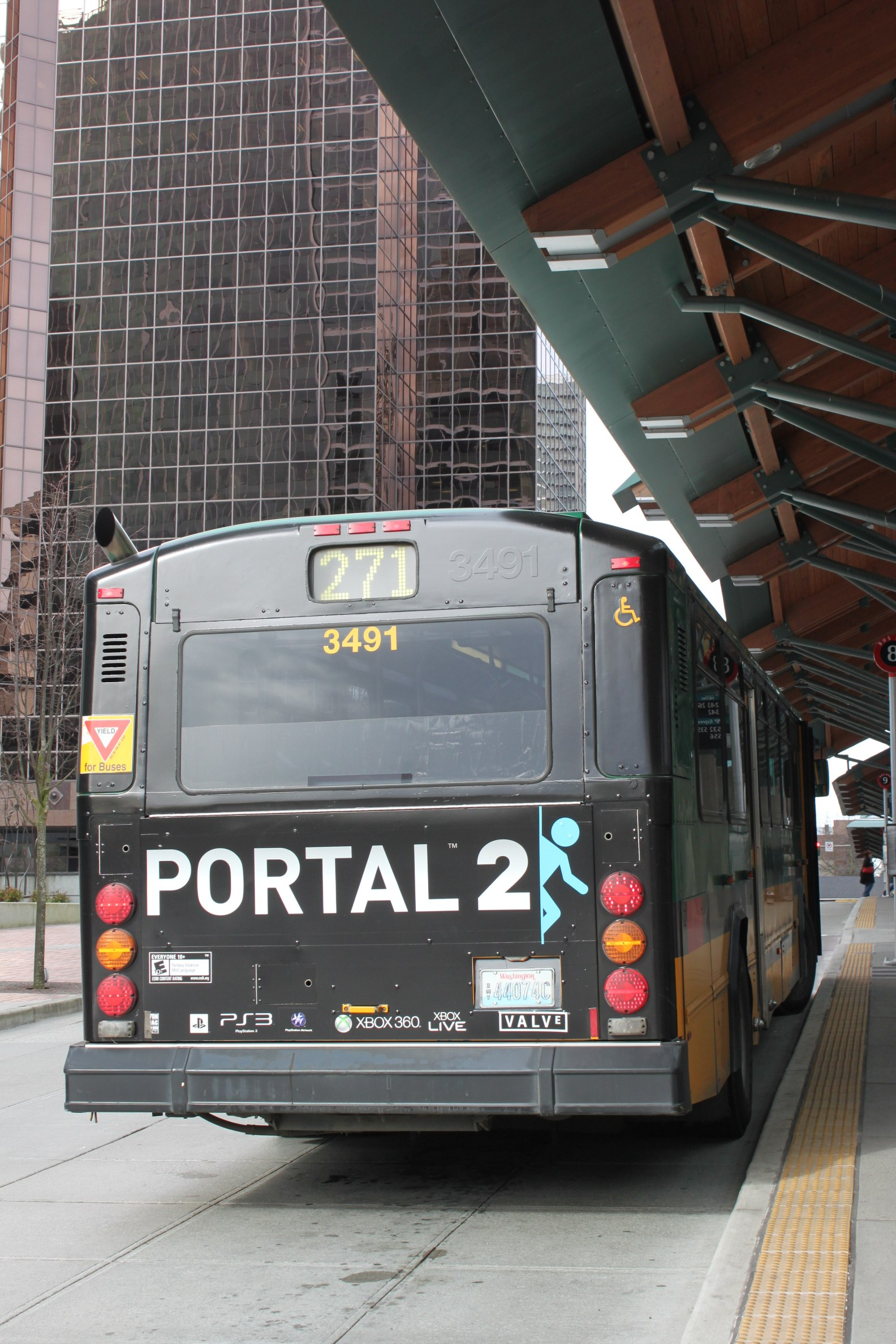
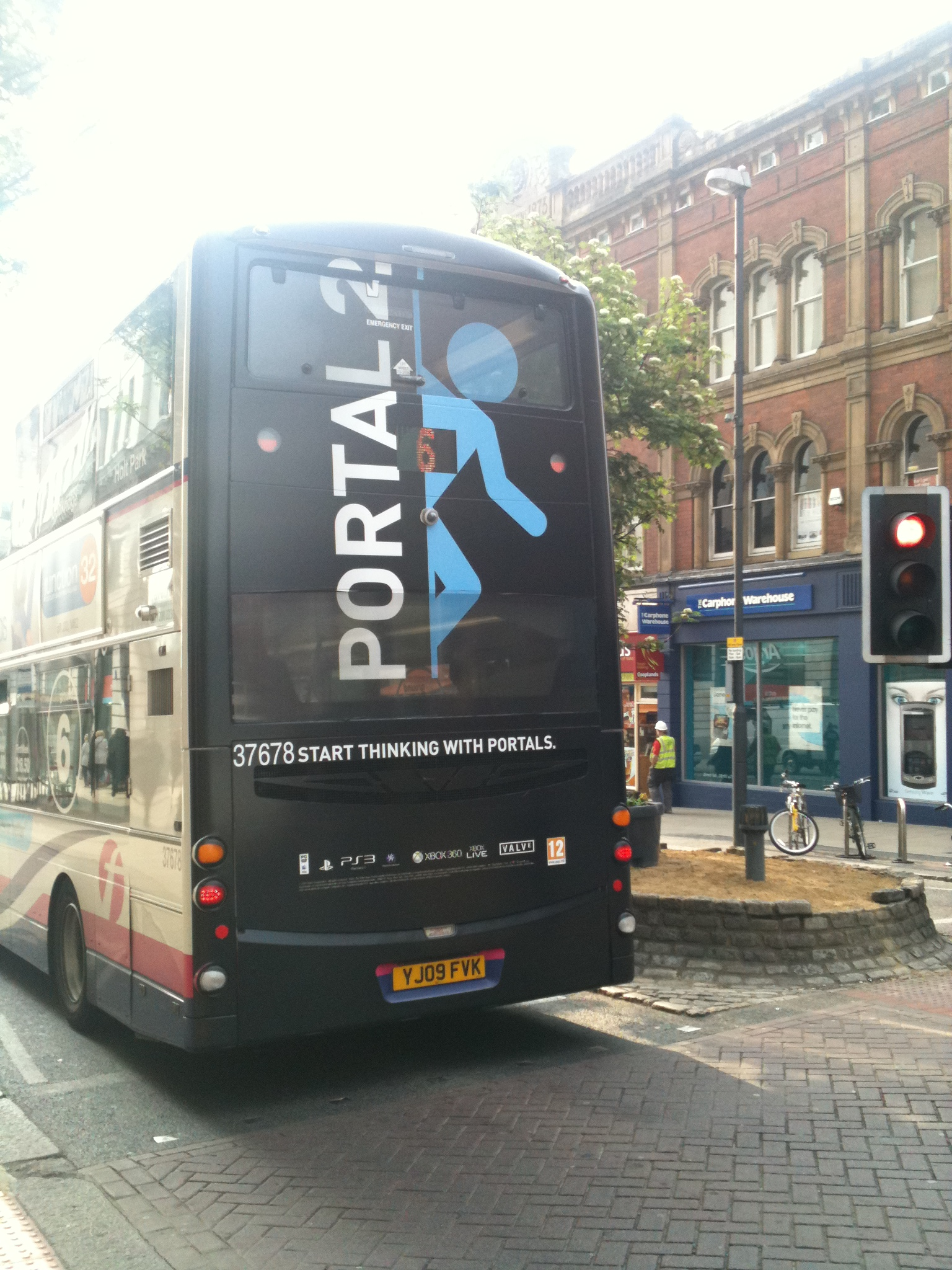
Portal 2 advertisements on the back of buses in Bellevue, Washington, and Leeds, West Yorkshire

On April 1, 2011, Valve released another alternate reality game called the Potato Sack. Players tried to solve the multi-tiered puzzle, coordinating efforts through web sites and chat rooms. Some journalists believed the game denoted the release of Portal 2 on April 15, 2011, instead of the target release date of April 19, 2011. On April 15, the players discovered "GLaDOS@Home", a distributed computing spoof that encouraged participants to play the games to unlock Portal 2 early. Once the puzzles were solved, Portal 2 was unlocked on April 18 at around 21:30 PST, roughly ten hours before its planned release at 7:00 PST on the next day.

Valve created a series of television commercials to promote Portal 2. Valve had worked with advertising agencies in the past, but Lombardi found the advertisements created had shown little ingenuity. Valve's Doug Lombardi had been disappointed by "Copycat treatments. Cliché treatments. Treatments that reveal the agency wasn't listening in the initial meeting." Using viewer feedback, Valve tailored the ad content until they were satisfied with the results. The ads took eight weeks to complete. Valve also developed online promotional videos featuring J. K. Simmons narrating as Cave Johnson, to promote new elements of Portal 2's gameplay. These videos were part of a larger effort described by Newell as a "documentary-style investment opportunity" for Portal 2. An earlier video released on February 14, 2011, promoted the cooperative aspect of Portal 2 as a St. Valentine's gift and "lit up our preorders, our buzz, all the metrics that are used and collected by publishers and retailers". Lombardi said the videos "dwarfed the demos and interviews we did". Valve also offered Portal 2-themed merchandise, such as posters, drinking glasses, and T-shirts.

== Release ==
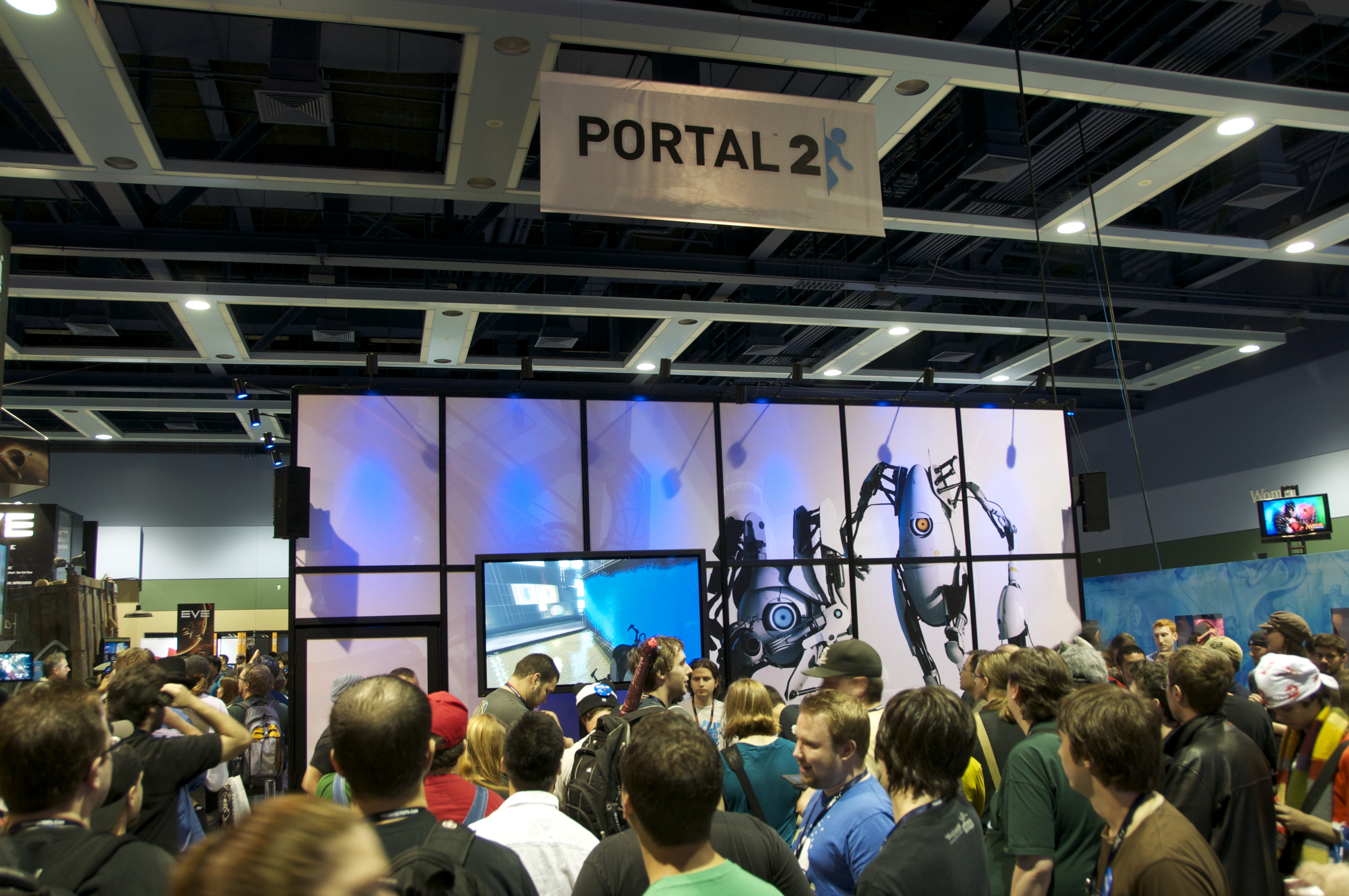
A crowd gathering for the Portal 2 demo booth at the PAX Prime 2010

The March 2010 announcement said that Portal 2 would be released in late 2010. In August 2010, Valve postponed the release to February 2011, with a Windows release date of February 9, to allow it to complete changes to the game's dialogue, to fill and connect about sixty test chambers, and to finish refinements to the gel gameplay mechanic. Valve announced a further delay in November 2010 and gave a release dates through retail channels in the week of April 18, 2011: April 20 in North America and April 22 in Europe and Australia. Wolpaw stated that this eight-week delay was used to expand the game's content before reaching an internal milestone called a "content lock", after which no further content could be added. The remaining development work involved debugging. Newell allowed the delay considering the added benefits of the new content, because he thought the company would not lose any commercial opportunities because of it. On February 18, 2011, Newell confirmed that Valve had completed the development work on Portal 2 and that they were "waiting for final approvals and to get the discs manufactured". Portal 2 was the first Valve product simultaneously released for Windows and Mac OS X computers through the Steam platform. The retail copies and PlayStation 3 and Xbox 360 versions were distributed by Electronic Arts.

In early 2014, Valve released a beta version for Linux distributions. The Xbox 360 version was added to the backwards compatibility feature for the Xbox One in June 2016. Alongside Portal, Portal 2 was released on the Nintendo Switch on June 28, 2022, as part of the Portal: Companion Collection, developed by Valve and Nvidia Lightspeed Studios.

=== PlayStation 3 ===
The announcement that Portal 2 would be available on PlayStation 3 came as a surprise to the industry because Gabe Newell had criticized that console in the past, citing difficulties in the port of The Orange Box. The move toward the PlayStation 3 was a result of growing frustration with Microsoft's policies for Xbox 360 content, including the difficulty of releasing patches and new content. Newell saw Sony's publication model as more open, allowing Steam-like features to be used on the console. Portal 2 was the first PlayStation 3 game to support a subset of features from Steamworks, including automatic updates, downloadable content, and community support. Players with a PlayStation 3 copy of the game could link a Steam account to play the game for free on Windows. The game supported cross-platform play between the PlayStation 3, Windows, and OS X versions. PlayStation cross-play was discontinued in 2016.

The Steam overlay shows the player's friends on both Steam and the PlayStation Network, with achievements rewarded for both Steam and PlayStation Network Trophies. Players can unlock the game on Steam for Windows and OS X for no additional charge. The integration of Steamworks on the PlayStation 3 allows Valve to collect data about problems that arise after shipping and push appropriate updates. Valve has stated they do not plan on integrating other PlayStation 3 features, such as 3D television or PlayStation Move support. In June 2012, Valve announced that the PlayStation 3 version would be patched later that year to include support for the PlayStation Move motion controller, and to add the additional content that was previously provided with the Hydra, under the name Portal 2 In Motion. The patch was released in early November 2012. A free co-op add-on for the Portal 2 In Motion content was added in June 2013. Valve said that despite additional support for PlayStation 3 over Xbox 360, the core game is the same on both platforms.

=== Razer Hydra ===
Sixense developed a version of Portal 2 to support the Razer Hydra motion controller for PC that allows enhanced control of some game elements. Ten extra single-player levels are available as downloadable content for this version. Writer Chet Faliszek said Sixense developers spent nine months to a year in-house at Valve preparing the native version. A limited edition of the Razer Hydra comes bundled with a digital license for Portal 2 for PC.

== Additional content ==
=== Bonus and downloadable content ===
Portal 2 includes bonus content, including four promotional videos, a Lab Rat comic, and an interactive trailer for the 2011 film Super 8, constructed with the Source game engine. A feature called "Robot Enrichment" allows players to customize the cooperative campaign characters with new gestures and cosmetic items such as hats or flags. These can be earned in-game, traded with other players, or bought through microtransactions at the in-game store.

Valve planned to produce downloadable content for Portal 2, beginning with Peer Review, released on October 4, 2011. The content, which is free regardless of platform, includes a new cooperative campaign which extends the game's story. A week from the end of the cooperative campaign, GLaDOS prepares Atlas and P-Body to deal with an intruder within Aperture Science—the bird that had previously abducted her as a potato. The content also adds a "challenge mode" similar to that in Portal—players try to complete specific chambers with the shortest time or fewest portals used, both which are tracked on overall and friends leaderboards. The challenge modes are available for both single-player and cooperative modes.

As of January 2013, Valve supports fan reuse of Portal 2 content, offering selected assets and assistance. The Windows release of Bastion includes a weapon inspired by Portal 2's Conversion Gel and turrets; its developer Supergiant Games received writing assistance from Erik Wolpaw and McLain voiced new lines for the turrets. An add-on scenario for Hidden Path Entertainment's tower defense game Defense Grid: The Awakening incorporates GLaDOS as an antagonist using new dialogue from McLain and assets from Portal 2. Wolpaw and McLain also helped to create additional lines for GLaDOS for a custom single-player map commissioned by Gary Hudston, which he used to propose marriage to his fiancée, Stephanie. For a patch for Bethesda's The Elder Scrolls V: Skyrim that incorporated support for Steam Workshop content, Valve developed a free add-on module that introduced the Space Core as a non-player character that follows the player around. Valve collaborated with Zen Studios to create a Portal 2-themed pinball table, among other Valve-themed tables, for their games Pinball FX 2 and Zen Pinball. A Portal 2-themed set is available for Lego Dimensions by Warner Bros. Entertainment and Traveller's Tales; the game features additional stories written by Traveller's Tales with Valve's blessing set after the events of Portal 2, with Ellen McLain, Stephen Merchant and J.K. Simmons reprising their roles, as well as a new GLaDOS credits song written by Jonathan Coulton and performed by McLain.

=== Community content ===
According to Faliszek, user-generated content for Portal 2 would be available on all platforms, but because of software dependencies, the necessary modding tools would only be available for Windows. Valve released beta versions of the modding tools on May 10, 2011, and supported a competition held by the community mapping website "Thinking with Portals" in May 2011, providing prizes for the most-selected maps. The "Perpetual Testing Initiative", a free title update for the Windows and Mac versions, was released on May 8, 2012, and includes a new, accessible level editor and a means of obtaining and sharing user-created levels through the Steam Workshop. In November 2011, GTTV host Geoff Keighley said that Valve was developing a simplified level editing tool to allow novice editors to assemble test chambers without learning how to use the modified Valve Hammer Editor, and an in-game system to distribute user-created levels via the Steam Workshop. This mapping system entered beta testing in March 2012. Within a few days of release, the Perpetual Testing Initiative add-on had been used to create 35,000 maps, with 1.3 million downloads of these maps through Steam. Within a month, more than 150,000 user-created maps were available. The first release of the Perpetual Testing Initiative was limited to single-player maps, but a patch released in August 2012 enabled users to create new levels for cooperative play.

In addition to player-created levels, there have been complete mods of Portal 2 created by users. Several notable mods are self-contained playable campaigns in their own right, and have earned critical praise. Thinking with Time Machine is a single-player mod for Portal 2 created by Ruslan Rybka and released in 2014, which gives the player the ability to record actions that can be played back by a duplicate of the player-character, including the use of a second set of portals. Aperture Tag: The Paint Gun Testing Initiative is a single-player mod for Portal 2 developed by "The Aperture Tag Team" released in 2014. The mod replaces the portal gun with a gun that can shoot the various gels (mimicking how Tag: the Power of Paint worked) to otherwise various portal-based puzzles. Portal Stories: Mel is a single-player mod of Portal 2 developed by Prism Studios, a group made up of eight fans of the Portal series. The mod was released on June 25, 2015, for Windows, OS X and Linux systems, available freely to people that own Portal 2 on Steam. Portal Reloaded is a single-player mod for Portal 2 created by Jannis Brinkmann and was released on April 19, 2021, exactly 10 years after the release of Portal 2. The mod gives players the ability to fire a third portal, the "time portal", to travel between the present and future versions of each test chamber. Portal: Revolution is a single-player mod for Portal 2 developed by Second Face Software, released on January 6, 2024.

== Reception ==
=== Critical reception ===
Reception

Aggregate scores
Aggregator	Score
GameRankings	(PC) 95 (X360) 94.00% (PS3) 93.95%
Metacritic	95/100

Review scores
Publication	Score
1Up.com	A+
Edge	9/10
Eurogamer	10/10
Famitsu	37 (10, 9, 9, 9)/40
G4	5/5
Game Informer	9.5/10
GameSpot	9.0/10
IGN	9.5/10
PC Gamer (US)	94/100

Portal 2 was a strong favorite of gaming journalists during closed-door previews at the E3 2010 convention. The Game Critics Awards, selected by journalists and critics, awarded Portal 2 the title of Best PC Game and Best Action/Adventure Game, and nominated the game for Best of Show and Best Console Game. IGN named Portal 2 as its Best of E3 for PC, Xbox 360, and PlayStation 3 systems and Best Puzzle Game, and nominated it for Best Overall Game. GameSpy named Portal 2 the Best Overall Game and Best Puzzle Game of E3. Portal 2 won the 2010 Spike Video Game Award for "Most Anticipated Game for 2011".

Portal 2 received universal acclaim upon release. Several reviewers identified Portal 2 as an early contender for "Game of the Year", while others called it one of the best games of all time. Upon release, the game was widely considered to be as good as or better than the original. Eurogamer's Oli Welsh said that the game avoids the normal pitfalls that developers introduce in sequels, stating that "Portal is perfect. Portal 2 is not. It's something better than that." Gus Mastrapa of The A.V. Club wrote that with Portal 2, Valve had alleviated any doubts that "Portal could be expanded into a big, narrative experience with all the bells and whistles of a mainstream gaming hit". IGN's Charles Onyett wrote that the sequel "makes the original look like the prototype it was" by expanding the game in gameplay and story.

Most reviewers praised the writing and voice acting in the game. Dan Stapleton of PC Gamer was able to predict many of the plot twists within Portal 2's story but "still looked forward to witnessing exactly how the characters would react"; he praised the development of the characters, as "their charm makes what would otherwise be an empty and lifeless world feel boisterous and alive". The characters were well received. Onyett wrote that Merchant's "obvious enthusiasm for the role benefits the game" and that the "consistently clever writing perfectly complements the onscreen action". Game Informer's Adam Biessener considered Johnson to be an even better character than GLaDOS, and praised the game's "pitch-perfect delivery" and "brilliant comedic timing". In contrast, Peter Bright of Ars Technica wrote that compared to the loneliness and despair he felt while playing the first game, the characters, Wheatley and GLaDOS, lost some of this feeling, and "the inane babble served only to disrupt the mood".

Portal 2's additional gameplay elements, like light bridges, lasers, and the gels, were praised as appropriate additions to the game. Reviewers were pleased with the difficulty of the puzzles throughout the game, which appeared visually complicated at first but had uncomplicated solutions. Time's Evan Narcisse said that he feared the addition of new gameplay elements would "dilute the purity of the experience, but everything's still executed with Valve's high level of charm and panache." Tom Hoggins of The Telegraph praised the manner with which these elements were introduced through a "brilliant learning curve of direction, rather than instruction", and considered it a "design ethos that is supremely generous, but dealt with marvellous economy". Chris Kohler of Wired wrote that the game's puzzles "never require excessively complicated solutions", and that much of the puzzle solving is "filled with moments that will have you slapping your forehead and thinking, 'Oh my God, I'm such an idiot—why didn't I see that before?'". Stapleton was not as pleased with the gel additions as with the other new mechanics, calling it "difficult to control". He felt that they have "only a couple of uses at most". Bright felt that Portal 2 was easier than its predecessor; he noted that many levels served primarily as tutorials for new mechanics, requiring "careful use of the tools provided", leaving him with the impression that "the game was on rails".

The cooperative puzzle solving aspect was highlighted as a valuable addition to the game. Welsh called the cooperative mode "one of the most satisfying and genuinely collaborative gaming experiences you can have with a friend". Onyett wrote, "Valve knows how a good co-operative mode requires a game design that doesn't simply encourage but requires you to work together. In Portal 2, communication is vital to success". Several reviewers praised the non-verbal cues that players could initiate to work with their partners. Portal 2 was praised for the amount of detail in its design, sound, and music. Nelson credited the "sheer amount of detail" put into the game's world, and wrote, "it all feels very real and natural with brief moments where you're simply sucked into this world". Onyett was impressed with the amount of visual details and capabilities Valve achieved from their Source game engine and that the added details and animations of the levels "consistently serv[ed] not only to entertain the eye but to expand our understanding of the game's characters". Hoggins wrote that the game's world reacted to the player-character Chell's presence "in a startlingly organic way", and praised Valve's design as "an achievement of world-building that compares favourably with BioShock's underwater city of Rapture".

Some reviewers said that the second act of the game, taking place in the less-structured portion of the old Aperture facilities, may be confusing to some players. Young wrote that in the second act, the game "cranks up the difficulty level at a speed that may dishearten casual gamers", and said that particularly when traveling between chambers, he had "absolutely no idea where I was supposed to head next". Kohler wrote that while the player can explore the abandoned areas of Aperture, "none of it ever does anything—it's just a lot of sterile, duplicated, non-interactive environments". Watters wrote that the loading time between the game's levels, in contrast to earlier Valve games, are "long enough to make you take notice and wish they were shorter". Watters also said that it was unfortunate that the game lacks "stand-alone test chambers and leaderboards ... but even so, Portal 2 is not light on content" without these. Welsh said that the attempt to recapture the spirit of the song "Still Alive" at the end credits of Portal 2 "was a mistake". Video game critic Ben "Yahtzee" Croshaw wrote in his Extra Punctuation column that, while Portal 2 was a "very good game", it unnecessarily retconned portions of the original game's story, and did not really further the game's concept. However, this criticism was directed solely at the campaign, and he stated that he found the game's co-op to be "much more appealing and much more within the spirit of the original".

On April 20, 2011, it was reported that customers had launched a protest against perceived shortcomings of Portal 2. Users complained that the game was too short—some saying that it is only four hours long, about the existence of paid, downloadable content for some versions at launch, and that the Windows and OS X versions were ports of the console version. Other journalists countered that the quality of the graphics on the Windows and Mac versions did not suggest a simple console port. Stephen Totilo of Kotaku wrote that the game lasted nine hours and that the downloadable content consisted purely of cosmetic add-ons. Some journalists said that the minimal impact of The Potato Sack alternative reality game on the early release of Portal 2 may be influencing the user scores.

=== Sales ===
Based on sales data from Amazon.com, Portal 2 was the best-selling game in the United States in the first week of its release, but was overtaken by Mortal Kombat in its second week. According to NPD Group, Portal 2 was the second-best selling game in the U.S. in April 2011, at 637,000 copies, and the fourth-best selling in May. However, NPD does not include sales on Valve's Steam platform. Portal 2 was the best selling game in the U.K. in the first week of its release, the first number-one for a Valve game. It retained the top spot during its second week.

Portal 2 was released a few days before the PlayStation Network outage. Gamasutra analyst Matt Matthews said that, based on NPD Group data, the outage "did not seriously affect retail sales of software", but some developers did report drops in sales. ShopToNews analyst Joe Anderson expected that the effect of the outage on UK sales of Portal 2 would be mild. On June 22, Newell announced that Portal 2 had sold 3 million copies. As of July 2011, Electronic Arts stated that more than 2 million copies of Portal 2 have been sold by retailers worldwide. In an August 2011 interview, Newell stated that "Portal 2 did better on the PC than it did on the consoles". Upon release of the Perpetual Testing Initiative in May 2012, Newell stated that Portal 2 had shipped more than 4 million units, with the PC and OS X versions outselling the console versions. Overall, Portal and Portal 2 had together shipped more than 8 million units.

=== Awards ===
Portal 2 won the title of "Ultimate Game of the Year" at the 2011 Golden Joystick Awards, and ranked second place on Time's "Top 10 Video Games of 2011". Gamasutra, IGN, Eurogamer, Kotaku, the Associated Press, and The Mirror listed Portal 2 as their top video game of 2011. The game received twelve nominations including "Game of the Year" for the 2011 Spike Video Game Awards, where it was the most-nominated title, and won for "Best PC Game", "Best Male Performance" for Stephen Merchant, "Best Female Performance" for Ellen McLain, "Best Downloadable Content", and "Best Multiplayer Game". The title was nominated for five Game Developers Choice Awards for 2012, including "Game of the Year", and won in the "Best Narrative", "Best Audio" and "Best Game Design" categories. It was nominated for ten Interactive Achievement Awards from the Academy of Interactive Arts & Sciences, including "Game of the Year"; it was ultimately awarded with outstanding achievements in "Connectivity", "Original Music Composition", and "Character Performance" for Wheatley. Portal 2 was nominated for six BAFTA Video Games Award categories, and won for "Best Game", "Best Story" and "Best Design". The Game Audio Network Guild awarded the game for "Best Dialog", "Best Interactive Score", and "Best Original Vocal – Pop" (for "Want You Gone"). In the inaugural New York Videogame Critics Circle Awards, Portal 2 was given the top honors for best writing and best acting. The Perpetual Testing Initiative add-on was awarded the 2012 Golden Joystick for "Best Use of DLC". Portal 2 was nominated for the 2016 Steam Awards by the Steam community and won the award for “Villain Most In Need Of A Hug”.

Awards and nominations for Portal 2
Year	Award	Category	Result	Ref.
2010	Game Critics Awards	Best PC Game	Won	
2010	Game Critics Awards	Best Action/Adventure Game	Won	
2011	Golden Joystick Awards	Ultimate Game of the Year	Won	
2011	Spike Video Game Awards	Game of the Year	Nominated	
2011	Spike Video Game Awards	Best Xbox 360 Game	Nominated	
2011	Spike Video Game Awards	Best PC Game	Won	
2011	Spike Video Game Awards	Best Multiplayer	Won	
2011	Spike Video Game Awards	Best Song in a Game ("Exile Vilify")	Nominated	
2011	Spike Video Game Awards	Best Song in a Game ("Want You Gone")	Nominated	
2011	Spike Video Game Awards	Best Original Score	Nominated	
2011	Spike Video Game Awards	Best Performance by a Human Male (Stephen Merchant)	Won	
2011	Spike Video Game Awards	Best Performance by a Human Female (Ellen McLain)	Won	
2011	Spike Video Game Awards	Character of the Year (Wheatley)	Nominated	
2011	Spike Video Game Awards	Best DLC (Peer Review)	Won	
2011	16th Satellite Awards	Outstanding Action/Adventure Game	Nominated	
2012	Game Developers Choice Awards	Game of the Year	Nominated	
2012	Game Developers Choice Awards	Best Narrative	Won	
2012	Game Developers Choice Awards	Best Audio	Won	
2012	Game Developers Choice Awards	Best Game Design	Won	
2012	Game Developers Choice Awards	Innovation	Nominated	
2012	15th Annual Interactive Achievement Awards	Game of the Year	Nominated	
2012	15th Annual Interactive Achievement Awards	Adventure Game of the Year	Nominated	
2012	15th Annual Interactive Achievement Awards	Outstanding Achievement in Game Direction	Nominated	
2012	15th Annual Interactive Achievement Awards	Outstanding Achievement in Art Direction	Nominated	
2012	15th Annual Interactive Achievement Awards	Outstanding Achievement in Character Performance (Wheatley)	Won	
2012	15th Annual Interactive Achievement Awards	Outstanding Achievement in Connectivity	Won	
2012	15th Annual Interactive Achievement Awards	Outstanding Achievement in Gameplay Engineering	Nominated	
2012	15th Annual Interactive Achievement Awards	Outstanding Achievement in Original Music Composition	Won	
2012	15th Annual Interactive Achievement Awards	Outstanding Achievement in Story	Nominated	
2012	15th Annual Interactive Achievement Awards	Outstanding Innovation in Gaming	Nominated	
2012	Game Audio Network Guild Awards	Best Interactive Score	Tie	
2012	Game Audio Network Guild Awards	Best Original Vocal Song – Pop ("Want You Gone")	Won	
2012	Game Audio Network Guild Awards	Best Dialog	Won	
2012	8th British Academy Games Awards	Best Game	Won	
2012	8th British Academy Games Awards	Design	Won	
2012	8th British Academy Games Awards	Action	Nominated	
2012	8th British Academy Games Awards	Performer (Stephen Merchant)	Nominated	
2012	8th British Academy Games Awards	Story	Won	
2012	8th British Academy Games Awards	GAME Award of 2011	Nominated	
2012	Golden Joystick Awards	DLC of the Year (Perpetual Testing Initiative)	Won	

== Educational use ==
=== Teach with Portals ===
Valve announced "Teach with Portals" and "Steam for Schools" in June 2012, initiatives that offered Portal 2 and Portal 2 Puzzle Maker for education. The educational version was free but only contained the single-player campaign and Puzzle Maker, and was only available for "Steam for Schools" users.

Several critics wrote that Portal 2 excels in teaching the player to solve puzzles; in a review for the New York Times, Seth Schiesel wrote, "Somewhere out there an innovative, dynamic high school physics teacher will use Portal 2 as the linchpin of an entire series of lessons and will immediately become the most important science teacher those lucky students have ever had." Mathematics and science teachers wrote e-mails to Valve to tell them how they had included Portal in their classroom lessons as part of a project to promote the "gamification of learning". Portal developers Joshua Weier and Yasser Malaika led a team within Valve to explore ways of using Portal 2 for education. This led to the development of Puzzle Maker, a level editor for Portal 2 players, built from the professional tools used to develop the game. Weier and Malaika did not want to design curricula themselves, but wanted to provide educators with tools for creating lesson plans. Hammer, the only tool freely available before the release of the built-in level editor in 2012, was difficult for educators to learn and understand. To address this, Valve gave Puzzle Maker an easy-to-learn interface and the ability to share puzzles and lesson plans. The tools were developed with a mathematics teacher and her students. This formed the basis of a new "Steam for Schools" initiative launched in June 2012, under which educators could acquire Portal 2 and the Puzzle Maker software free of charge for classroom use through its "Teach with Portals" program. In November 2012, Valve estimated that over 2,500 educators were using the "Teach with Portals" software within their lesson plans.

=== Research ===
In 2016, a study demonstrated that the Portal 2 Puzzle Maker can be used as a measure of fluid intelligence, similar to the Bochumer Matrices Test (BOMAT). Referred to as the Portal 2 Test Battery, the participants of the study completed a series of test chambers that progressively became harder.

Some studies have been conducted to determine if video games can have a significant impact on cognitive and non-cognitive skills. Through multiple pretests and post tests, a 2014 study has shown that Portal 2 can improve problem solving skills, spatial skills, and persistence for a designated task. The participants of this study did not need to have previous gaming experience. Another study done in 2017 found that commercial video games, like Portal 2, can also increase communication, adaptability and resourcefulness.
