= Nicolas Portal =

French road bicycle racer (1979–2020)

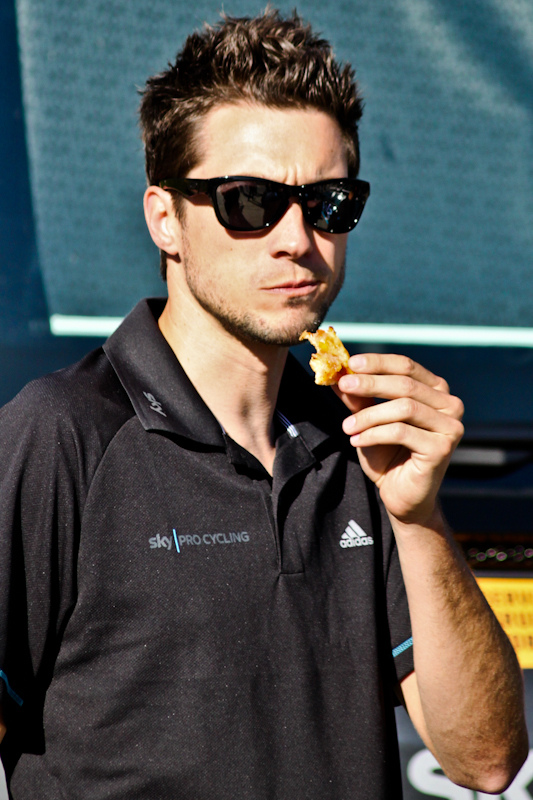
- Portal at the 2011 Giro d'Italia

Personal information
- Full name: Nicolas Portal
- Born: 23 April 1979 Auch, France
- Died: 3 March 2020 (aged 40) Andorra la Vella, Andorra
- Height: 1.84 m (6 ft 0 in)
- Weight: 70 kg (154 lb)

Cycling career
- Sport: Cycling
- Discipline: Road
- Role: Rider

Professional teams
- 2002–2005: AG2R Prévoyance
- 2006–2009: Caisse d'Epargne–Illes Balears
- 2010: Team Sky

Managerial team
- 2011–2020: Team Sky

Major wins
- Critérium du Dauphiné Libéré, 1 stage (2004)

Nicolas Portal (23 April 1979 – 3 March 2020) was a French directeur sportif and professional road bicycle racer. He was born in Auch, France.

He missed much of the 2009 season because of problems with cardiac arrhythmia and retired as a professional cyclist following the 2010 season. He stayed with his final professional team, Team Sky, as a manager from the 2011 season. Following the retirement of Sean Yates, Portal was appointed lead directeur sportif of Team Sky for 2013.

He died of a heart attack on 3 March 2020, aged 40.

== Professional career ==
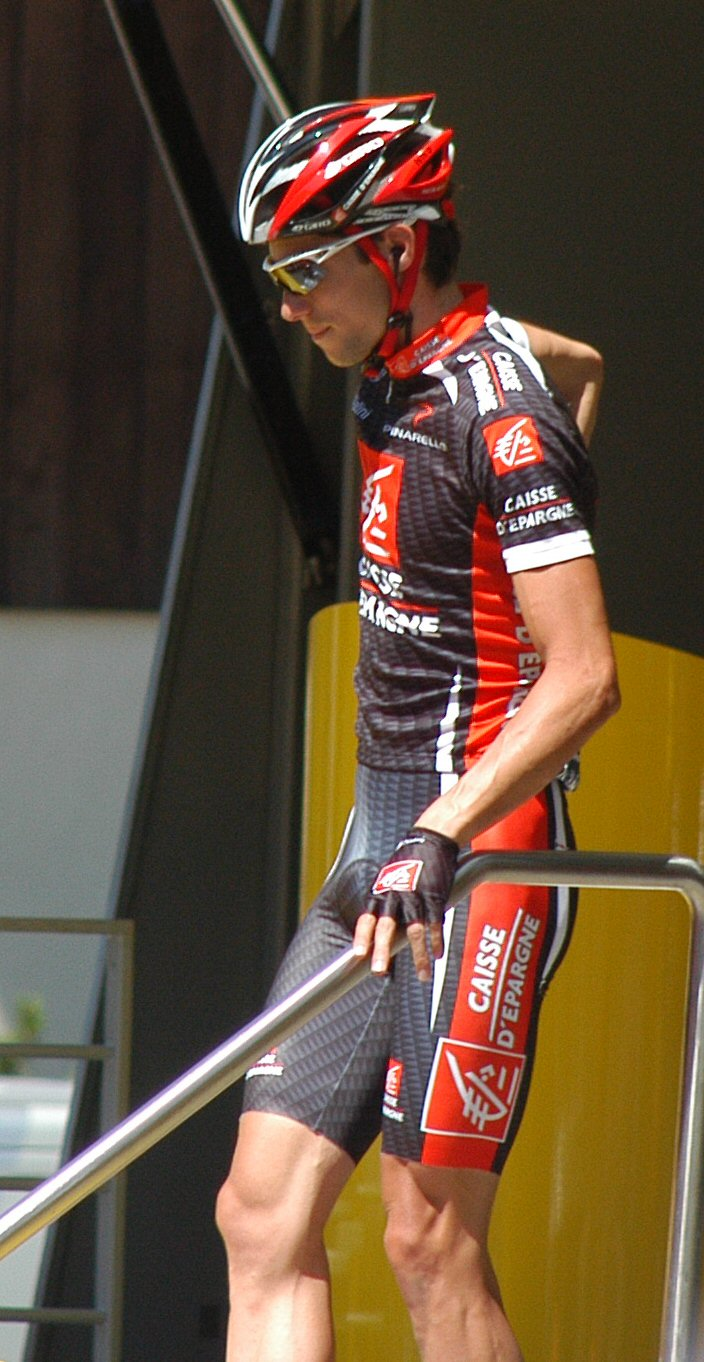
Portal at the 2007 Tour de France

Portal was born on 23 April 1979 in Auch, France. His father was a quarry manager and his mother worked as a medical secretary. He started cycling as a mountain biker and was successful at youth and under-23 levels in the late 1990s, before switching to road cycling. He rode as a stagiaire with AG2R Prévoyance at the end of 2001, having been recommended to team manager Vincent Lavenu by a mutual friend. Portal then turned professional with the team for 2002. He rode his first Grand Tour the same year at the Vuelta a España and then competed in the Tour de France for the first time in 2003. He would ride the Tour a further five times, always reaching the finish in Paris. His only professional victory came at the 2004 Critérium du Dauphiné Libéré, where he won stage 3 with a late attack on the final climb. While individual success was scarce, he established himself as one of the most reliable domestiques in the field. In 2006, he moved to Caisse d'Epargne–Illes Balears. Portal was part of the team that saw Óscar Pereiro win the 2006 Tour de France, a race he finished even though he suffered a serious crash on stage 15. He was joined at Caisse d'Epargne by his brother Sébastien, also a cyclist, the following year. He missed the entire 2009 season with cardiac arrhythmia, but rode a full final season with Team Sky in 2010.

== Career as sports director ==
Although he could not speak English, Portal was hired by Dave Brailsford as directeur sportif for Team Sky following his retirement as a cyclist, with Brailsford attributing his decision to Portal's "human qualities". For 2013, following the departure of some of Team Sky's leading staff, Portal was promoted to lead sporting director. Under his guidance, Sky riders won six of the next seven editions of the Tour de France, as well as one Vuelta a España and a Giro d'Italia. These victories made Portal one of the most successful sporting directors in the history of cycling. In 2019, after guiding Egan Bernal to victory in the Tour, Portal became the first sporting director to win the race with three different riders since Cyrille Guimard in 1983, having previously won it with Chris Froome four times and Geraint Thomas once.

== Death ==
Portal died suddenly from a heart attack, aged 40, at his home in Andorra on 3 March 2020. Following his death, his employer Ineos Grenadiers withdrew from all further races until 28 March, citing the "unique set of circumstances" of Portal's death and the coronavirus pandemic as reasons for the decision.

== Major results ==
2003
6th Grand Prix d'Ouverture La Marseillaise
2004
1st Stage 3 Criterium du Dauphiné Libéré
9th Overall Tour du Limousin
2005
10th Overall Herald Sun Tour
2006
7th Overall Four Days of Dunkirk

Source: ProCyclingStats

=== Grand Tour general classification results timeline ===
Grand Tour	2002	2003	2004	2005	2006	2007	2008
Giro d'Italia	—	—	—	—	—	—	—
Tour de France	—	82	72	88	100	57	65
Vuelta a España	84	—	—	—	—	—	—

Source: ProCyclingStats
