= Sébastien Portal =

French cyclist (born 1982)

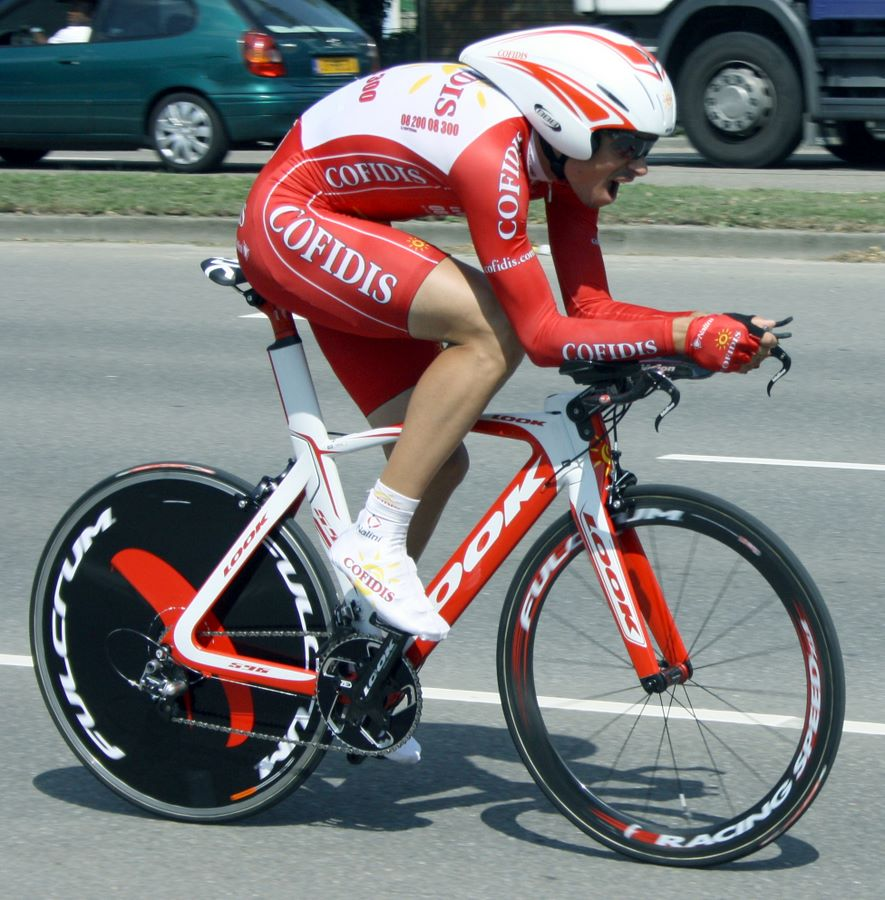

Personal information
- Full name: Sébastien Portal
- Born: June 4, 1982 (age 44) Auch, France
- Height: 1.80 m (5 ft 11 in)
- Weight: 66 kg (146 lb)

Cycling career
- Sport: Cycling
- Current team: Unattached
- Discipline: Road
- Role: Rider

Professional teams
- 2005–2006: Crédit Agricole
- 2007: Caisse d'Epargne
- 2008–2009: Cofidis

Sébastien Portal (born June 4, 1982 in Auch) is a French professional road bicycle racer. He is the brother of the late racing cyclist and directeur sportif Nicolas Portal.
