= Portal Stories: Mel =

2015 modification for Portal 2

- Developer: Prism Studios
- Publisher: Prism Studios
- Composer: Harry Callaghan
- Engine: Source
- Platforms: Windows; OS X; Linux
- Release: 25 June 2015
- Genre: Puzzle-platform
- Mode: Single-player

Portal Stories: Mel is a 2015 modification for Portal 2 developed and published by Prism Studios. Set in the Portal universe, the player controls Mel, a test subject with a prototype of the portal gun who must escape an underground facility after spending decades in artificial hibernation by completing puzzles. The player is guided by a maintenance core named Virgil. The puzzle-platform game includes custom voice acting, a soundtrack, and texture assets.

The mod's development began in 2011, and its release date was pushed back multiple times. After passing via the Steam Greenlight system in 2014, it was released on Steam for free on 25 June 2015. Prism Studios released its virtual reality successor Portal Stories: VR in May 2016, which featured short gameplay with custom soundtracks, voice acting, and two guns rather than the standard portal gun. Portal Stories: Mel has been criticised for its challenging difficulty, but lauded for its graphic design, ambition, and detail. Writing and the soundtrack received mixed opinions from reviewers. It won The Game Awards' Best Fan Creation category, as well as the Mod DB Mod of the Year awards in both the Editors Choice and Players Choice categories. Both mods received strongly positive reception from the Portal community.

== Gameplay ==
Like Portal 2, Portal Stories: Mel allows the player to solve various puzzles with portals.

Like the Portal series, Portal Stories: Mel is a puzzle-platform game played from the first-person perspective, in which the player must solve puzzles in "test chambers". The player controls the protagonist Mel throughout the game instead of series protagonist Chell. Mel was originally planned by Valve to be the protagonist of Portal 2, but was passed over in favour of returning Chell, the protagonist of Portal. Mel was then proposed as a character in Portal 2's cooperative mode, but was replaced by ATLAS and P-body. The developer of Portal Stories: Mel then incorporated the character in their game.

The core principles of Portal Stories: Mel remain unchanged from the official games: the player is also equipped with a prototype of the portal gun, which can create two ends of a portal, respectively coloured orange and blue. These portals can only be put on specific surfaces and can be blocked with electric barriers. The game features Portal 2 components, such as propulsion and repulsion gels. The propulsion gel, coloured orange, provides a speed boost to the player, while repulsion, coloured blue, gives the player a jump boost. "Light bridges" for traversing gaps, "tractor beams" for controlling objects in space, cubes, turrets, and buttons are also featured in the game. Portal Stories: Mel adds custom texture assets, new voice acting, and animations.

Portal Stories: Mel was designed to be a prequel to Portal 2. The game features 22 levels that are intended to be completed in around 6 to 10 hours.

== Plot ==
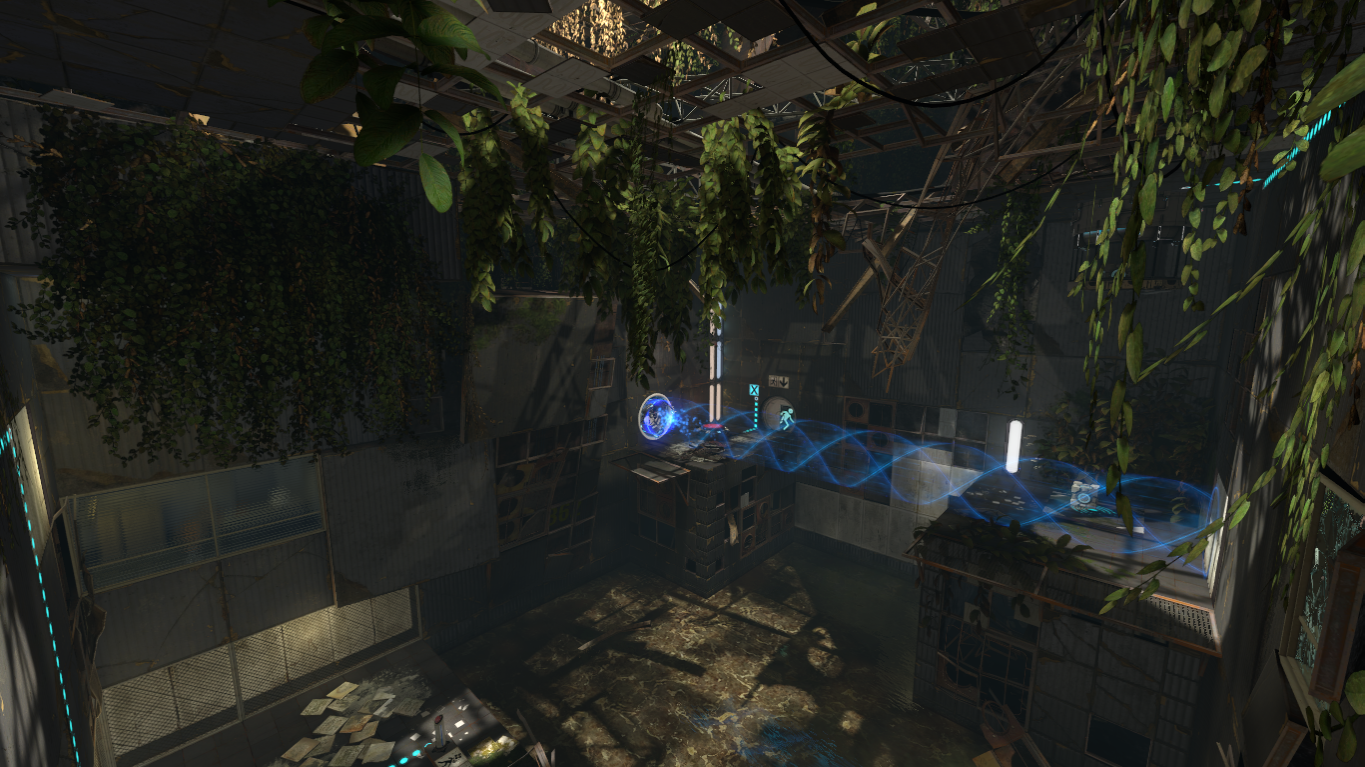
Portal Stories: Mel is set in the dilapidated underground complex of Aperture Science.

In 1952, when Aperture Science is still a fledgling company, Mel, a German Olympian who has been recruited as a test subject, arrives by tram at the Aperture Science Innovators headquarters in Michigan and makes her way through Aperture's company town and into a massive underground complex. Aperture's CEO, Cave Johnson, speaks to Mel through pre-recorded messages via intercom, informing her that she will take part in a test of the Aperture Innovators Short Term Relaxation Vault. The test goes wrong, and Mel is put in indefinite stasis.

Awakening in the distant future, Mel follows what seems to be the voice of Cave Johnson and obtains a portal gun. The voice reveals that he is not actually Cave Johnson but a maintenance core named Virgil, who offers to help Mel escape. Virgil guides Mel through the remnants of the old facility, explaining that the destruction of GLaDOS, the main overseer of Aperture's facility, caused most of the control systems in the facility to falter. (Note: As depicted in Portal)

Continuing upwards, they learn that the reserve power has caused a prototype security system, the Aperture Employee Guardian and Intrusion System (AEGIS), to become active. With GLaDOS absent, AEGIS attempts to track them through the facility to eliminate them by releasing deadly goo, deeming them potential threats to Aperture's (long-dead) scientists. Virgil realises the only way for Mel to escape is to disable AEGIS.

Going through overgrown test chambers, they eventually arrive at AEGIS's central core and successfully disable it. Mel enters the code to shut down AEGIS, but while doing so, she and Virgil learn that it was flooding the facility in an attempt to destroy GLaDOS's remains. Mel surrenders her portal gun and exits the facility in an elevator, bidding Virgil goodbye. At the top of the elevator, she finds the town where she entered Aperture in ruins.

In a post-credits scene, AEGIS has enough power left to initiate one final fail-safe: waking up test subject Chell by draining the reserve power so she can escape. (Note: Which sets up the events of Portal 2)

== Development and release ==
Portal Stories: Mel was developed and published by an independent team of Portal fans under the name Prism Studios. Its development began in 2011 and was originally intended to be published in early 2012. Following multiple delays, Prism Studios announced in March 2013 that some maps were rebuilt to match acceptable quality standards, with several members of the team also changing. The closed beta was announced in August 2013, after which maps were re-worked and modified to meet higher quality standards. On 20 June 2014, Prism Studios announced that Portal Stories: Mel would be released in the first quarter of 2015, with support for Microsoft Windows, OS X, and Linux platforms. Soon after, the mod was put through the Steam Greenlight system and was accepted on 1 August. The mod was, however, delayed again in February 2015.

During the development process, the team consulted Valve for development advice. The mod was released on Steam for free on 25 June 2015. Because it is a mod, users must own Portal 2 to play Portal Stories: Mel. The game features an hour-long custom soundtrack composed by Harry "Harry101UK" Callaghan, who also previously composed the soundtrack for Aperture Tag. An additional song for the game, titled "Time and Time Again", was written by Ian Wiese. Prism Studios also published developer commentary videos on YouTube. In response to complaints about the high difficulty level of the mod, the developers released a "Story Mode" campaign on 31 August 2015, with certain puzzles tweaked to reduce their difficulty. The "Story Mode" puzzles became the new default mode, and the original puzzles were repurposed as an alternative, higher-difficulty setting known as "Advanced Mode".

Prism Studios began working on a virtual reality game successor in 2016, using Unreal Engine 4. Initially scheduled for April 2016, Portal Stories: VR, a virtual reality game for HTC Vive and the successor to Portal Stories: Mel, was released for free in May 2016; the game features a small campaign with 10 puzzles designed for room-scale VR. The difficulty of the puzzles increases progressively throughout the game. Additionally, the game features new custom soundtracks, voice acting, and two types of guns. The first gun, the Aperture Science Instant Teleportation Device, lets the player teleport inside puzzle chambers while the second, the Aperture Science Apparatus Retrieval Tool, gives the player the ability to move cubes. Portal Stories: VR also incorporates virtual reality elements, such as requiring the player to crouch down to avoid lasers. Due to its short length, the game can be completed in approximately 30 minutes. Because it was released as a mod, Portal 2 is also required to play the game.

Afterwards, Prism Studios became a standalone game development company in August 2016. They later released The Captives: Plot of the Demiurge in 2018, but shut down in December 2020.

== Reception ==
Many media outlets complimented the mod's ambition and polish, but often criticised its challenging puzzles. Felix Schütz of PC Games found it unbelieving that it was created by a team of Portal fans, claiming that it could simply be "a small add-on" for the Portal series. Kyle Hilliard of Game Informer and Ian Higton of Eurogamer highlighted the game's similarity to Valve's Portal series. Rock Paper Shotgun listed Portal Stories: Mel as one of the best Portal 2 mods, with Craig Pearson saying that "it's an impressively made campaign". Digital Trends reported that the mod received a strongly positive reception from the community.

Christopher Livingston of PC Gamer noted the game's challenging puzzles. Michael Thomsen of The Washington Post similarly found the game to be difficult, and added that the game lacks tutorial puzzles, but that he was "hesitant to say those qualities are negatives". He also contrasted the game to Portal 2's puzzles, which instead directed the player to seek solutions on their own. Higton classified it as the Dark Souls of Portal games, noting the hard difficulty of puzzles, but nevertheless stated that it "nails what it means to be a Valve game". Although he rated the mod 7.5 overall, Ruslan Gubaidulllin of Overclockers.ru criticised the game's pacing, stating that the developers do not give the player a break from solving puzzles.

The game's graphics were commended by reviewers. Higton praised the mod's eccentric graphic design as well as the cinematic videos. Schütz said that the visuals "unfortunately had nothing new to offer" but this was compensated by the high quality of many areas. Hilliard, Ben Hanson, and Jonas Gössling of GameStar were also impressed with the design and details of the game's areas. Alice O'Connor of Rock Paper Shotgun lauded the portal gun's looks.

The writing was met with mixed reception from reviewers. Schütz said that while the writing was not as outstanding as Portal 2's, the character Virgil enhanced the game's atmosphere. Despite its long length, Gubaidullin said that the plot was unconvincing, claiming it lacked the "loneliness" and "hopelessness" of the Portal series and criticising Virgil's lack of charisma. Livingston was not fond of the mod's humour, but he did say it was written "with a lot of enthusiasm". Alexander Bohn-Elias of Eurogamer, on the other hand, felt the humour was "spot on" with Portal 2, while Higton and Gössling found the story enjoyable. Gender studies author Marc A. Ouellette wrote about Portal Stories: Mel, saying that "the recalamation of content by fans for purposes germane to themselves...can therefore include formations in which more fluid, post-binary sexual and gender identities emerge".

Reviewers were mixed on the game's voice acting and music. Livingston and Bohn-Elias praised the voice acting, particularly the Cave Johnson imitation. Griffin McElroy of Polygon regarded voice acting as a "great performance". Hilliard and Hanson, however, were less impressed by the voice acting. Schütz had mixed feelings about the custom soundtrack, but remarked that "the good tracks outweigh the bad ones". Gössling said that the soundtrack "creates a mood that immediately captivates [the player]".

David Jagneaux of UploadVR commended the voice acting and the surroundings of Portal Stories: VR. He also stated that while the puzzles are not challenging, the majority of the game "feels like little more than a tutorial". Jan-Keno Janssen of Heise.de said that the mod is similar to ambience in the original games. Overall, the mod received a very positive reception from the Steam community. The University of Sydney's School of Information Technologies included Portal Stories: VR as one of the games in their study about physical benefits of virtual reality. The research team determined that Portal Stories: VR required little movement and that its participants "had the lowest exertion measures and the heart-rate score was equal to very light activity".

=== Accolades ===
Award	Date	Category	Result	Ref.
The Game Awards	3 December 2015	Best Fan Creation	Won	
Mod DB Mod of the Year	22 December 2015	Editors Choice	Won	
Mod DB Mod of the Year	29 December 2015	Players Choice	Won	
