= Aperture Tag =

2014 modification for Portal 2

Aperture Tag: The Paint Gun Testing Initiative
- Developer: Aperture Tag Team
- Publisher: Aperture Tag Team
- Designer: Evanna Roman
- Composers: Harry Callaghan; Christopher McEvoy
- Engine: Source
- Platforms: Windows; OS X
- Release: July 15, 2014
- Genre: Puzzle-platform
- Mode: Single-player

Aperture Tag: The Paint Gun Testing Initiative is a 2014 puzzle-platform game developed and published by the Aperture Tag Team for Windows and OS X. Unlike the official Portal series, the gameplay revolves around a paint gun rather than a portal gun, that fires two kinds of gel, one of which gives the player a jump boost and the other a speed boost. It also introduces other new mechanisms such as the paint fizzler and Pneumatic Diversity Vents that transport the player. The game takes place after Portal 2 and the player is guided by a personality core Nigel to complete puzzles in the Aperture Science Enrichment Center.

The game also features new characters, voice acting, along with a co-op mode that includes a level editor. The game's development began in March 2013, passed through the Steam Greenlight system in February 2014, and was launched on Steam on July 15, 2014. Aperture Tag was praised for the concept of the paint gun, but the writing and voice acting was criticized. Upon release, the Portal community complained about the mod being a paid product; Portal 2 is also required to play Aperture Tag.

== Gameplay ==
Aperture Tag introduced features such as the paint fizzler (shown in the image) and the Pneumatic Diversity Vents.

Like the Portal series, Aperture Tag: The Paint Gun Testing Initiative is a puzzle-platform game in which the player must solve puzzles in "test chambers". While solving the puzzles, the player is provided with a paint gun that fires two kinds of gel, repulsion and propulsion, instead of a portal gun like in the Portal series. The two gels were featured in Portal 2; repulsion, colored blue, gives a jump boost and can be used as a bouncing pad, while propulsion, colored orange, provides a speed boost to the player. The repulsion gel can also be used to disable turrets. Unlike the stationary locations of gel in Portal 2, however, the paint gun allows the player to apply the gels to most surfaces.

The campaign consists of 27 test chambers, including re-used chambers from Portal 2. At the start of the game, the player must solve puzzles without a paint gun. Once the paint gun is obtained, the player can only use the repulsion gel; the propulsion gel is unlocked later in the game when the difficulty of puzzles increases unsteadily.

The game also features timed puzzles and toxic floors that kill the player upon collision. Throughout the game, the player encounters additional mechanisms such as buttons, spikes, and portals that cannot be placed by the player. An addition to Aperture Tag also includes the "paint fizzler", which disables and reactivates one or both gels on the player's paint gun when the player comes into contact with the feature. The game also takes advantage of transparent Pneumatic Diversity Vents, a cut part of Portal 2, that move the player from level to level instead of elevators that are present in Portal 2. The game does not feature the cinematic physics of Portal 2.

The game also features a modified level editor, allowing users to create their own maps, which can be used in the single-player or cooperative modes.

== Plot ==
Aperture Tag takes place in the Enrichment Center, the main development and testing facility of Aperture Science, following the events of the Portal 2 cooperative campaign. The Aperture Tag test subject appears near the end of the cooperative campaign. After waking up in a stasis chamber, the test subject is introduced to basic controls of the game as well as a personality core Nigel, who was designed by GLaDOS. Nigel then guides them to the paint gun while defeating turrets.

Once the test subject has acquired the paint gun, they must complete sixteen test chambers. Initially, the repulsion gel is only available, but the propulsion gel is unlocked after the seventh chamber. After completing the sixteenth chamber, the test subject told that they are supposed to enter the Aperture Laboratories Stability Stable Energy Reactor (ALSSER), but Nigel informs them that ALSSER must be deactivated. After fleeing the reactor, the test subject finds themselves in a set of chambers that are styled after different biomes. At the last chamber, the player can choose one of two endings. In the first ending, the test subject fights against turrets, and Nigel separates from the test subject, who subsequently burns in a fire pit. In the alternate ending, which is unlocked by closing the fire pit with a button, Nigel, as ordered by GLaDOS, allows the test subject to return to surface, which is later revealed to be a simulation.

== Development and release ==
Aperture Tag was developed and published by the Aperture Tag Team. The team, led by developer Evanna "Motanum" Roman, took inspiration from the Tag: The Power of Paint game, whose concept of paint gels was used in Portal 2. Roman played the game once Valve announced the addition of gels in Portal 2, after which Roman began considering the paint gun and gel concepts. After attending a Valve-hosted closed beta for the 2012 Perpetual Testing Initiative update, Roman asked Valve employees if they had planned on adding a paint gun to Portal 2. They responded that while a weapon_paintgun file was in the game, it did not do anything and had been dropped entirely from Portal 2. Roman then began working on her paint gun model. The paint gun that Roman used in Aperture Tag is a modified version of a paint gun from a Portal community modder that approved Roman using their design.

Prior to creating Aperture Tag, Roman also designed maps in the Source engine editor. After creating the initial paint gun map, Roman received praise from the Portal community. The development of Aperture Tag officially began in March 2013; the game was designed using Portal 2 Authoring Tools for Source engine games. After visiting Valve offices again in May 2013, Roman decided to make Aperture Tag a full modification release instead of a map pack. By the end of the year, all chambers were designed. Benjamin Thomas Blodgett helped program the compilation of maps in the modified in-game level editor.

The Aperture Tag Team submitted the map pack for Steam Greenlight in January 2014, to publish the game as a standalone mod. "A mod offers me more freedom. I can change the menu, viewmodel, etc. And it makes developing this much more easier", Roman said. Aperture Tag was approved by the Steam community through the Greenlight system on February 19. Prior to the release of Aperture Tag, demo levels of the game were available on the Steam Workshop for Portal 2. Roman was also initially undecided on whether to publish Aperture Tag with a price tag or to make it free of charge. She eventually decided to price it at US$7, making it the first paid mod on Steam. The game was released on July 15, 2014, for Microsoft Windows and OS X platforms. Considering that it is a mod, users must own Portal 2 to play Aperture Tag. The game was one of the top 300 on Steam in 2014.

While in the demo levels the voice of Cave Johnson was only present, in the full release of the game, Nigel received a custom voice actor. The game features a custom soundtrack composed by Harry "Harry101UK" Callaghan and Christopher McEvoy, as well as the song All These Walls by Abarax.

== Reception ==
Reception

Review scores
Publication	Score
PC Gamer (UK)	58/100
Pelit	75/100

Aperture Tag's reception was mixed. Christopher Livingston of PC Gamer praised the concept and mechanics of the paint gun and its auto-save system, but ultimately said that the game's "price is a tad optimistic for what you get". Heikki Hurme of Finnish video game magazine Pelit rated it 75 out of 100, saying that it had a "fun idea, but amateurish execution" (on hauska idea, mutta harrastelijamainen toteutus). Both Livingston and Aleksandr Levahin of VK Play noted many community chambers were available for Portal 2 at no cost, as opposed to the paid nature of Tag.

Opinions of the level design varied; Livingston said that it lacked the uniform quality of Portal 2, describing some puzzles as having inadequate design, but others being "satisfying to solve". Levahin described the puzzles as occasionally challenging, but criticized their textures, stating that the game looked worse than Portal 2.

Reviewers criticized the game's voice acting and writing. Hurme perceived Nigel as a "douchebag" that tries to mimic Wheatley from Portal 2. Livingston said that his "jokes certainly aren't funny", that he had trouble deciding what his personality is, and that the quality of voice acting and writing was not on the level of Portal 2.

Wired and Computer and Video Games magazines reported that upon release, the Portal community complained about the US$7 price tag and for not releasing it for free; with Wired also stating that they criticized Aperture Tag for its poor writing and voice acting. However, Rock Paper Shotgun listed Aperture Tag as one of the best Portal 2 mods.
