= Regent Bakery and Cafe =

Restaurant chain in the U.S. state of Washington

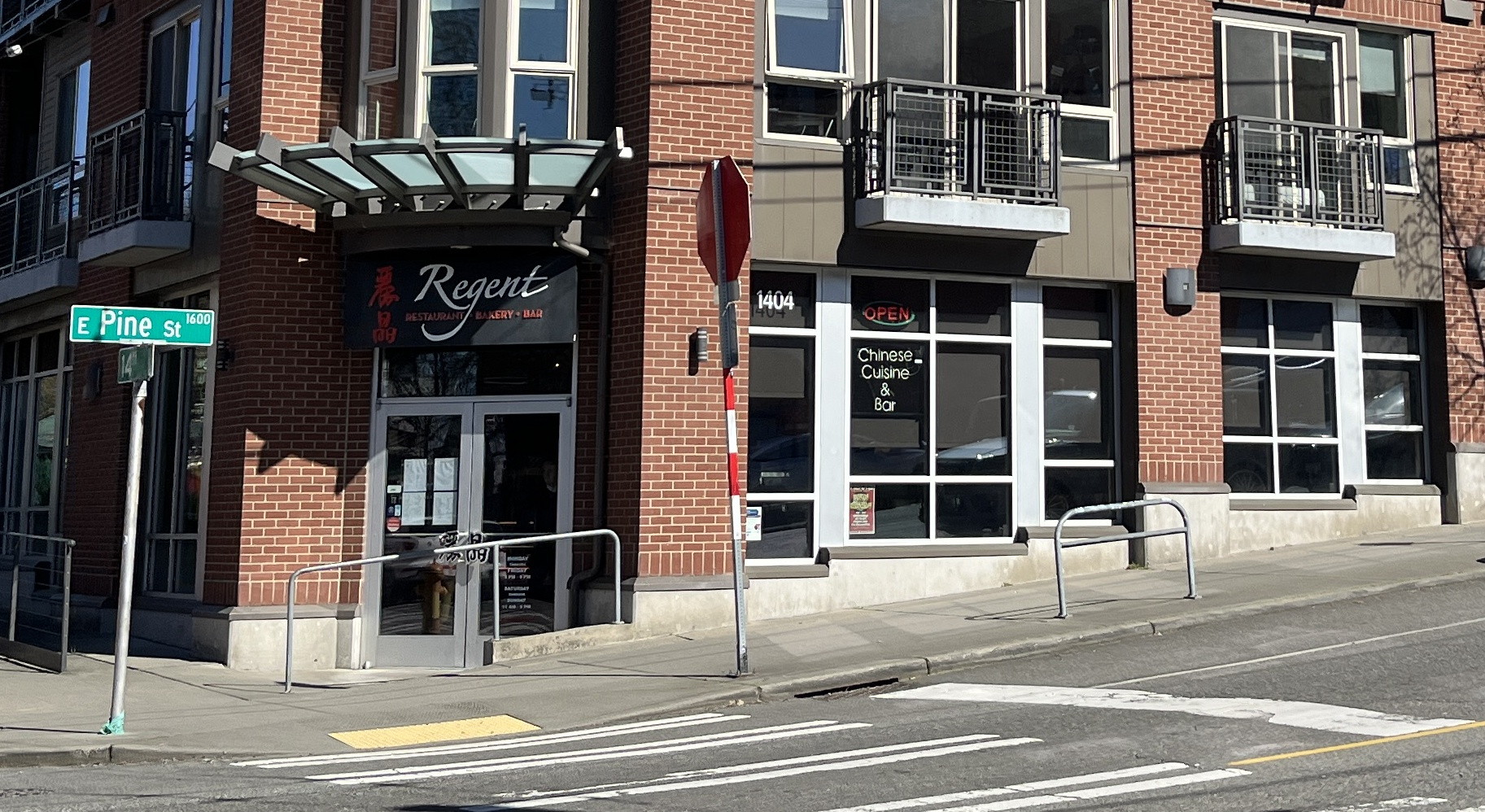
- Exterior of the Capitol Hill location in 2024
- Interactive map of Regent Bakery and Cafe

Restaurant information
- Established: 2000
- Food type: Chinese
- Location: 15159 Northeast 24th Street, Redmond, Washington, 98052, United States
- Coordinates: 47.63093°N 122.1383°W
- Other locations: 1404 East Pine Street, Seattle, 98122; 12816 Southeast 38th Street F, Bellevue, 98006
- Website: regentbakeryandcafe.com

Regent Bakery and Cafe (traditional Chinese: 麗晶; simplified Chinese: 丽晶) is a small chain of Chinese restaurants and bakeries in the Seattle metropolitan area, in the U.S. state of Washington. The family-owned and operated business was established in Redmond in 2000, and expanded to Seattle's Capitol Hill in 2012 and Bellevue. Regent initially sold cakes and gained popularity amongst employees of Redmond-based Microsoft. The menu was expanded to include Chinese cuisine such as chow fun, fried rice, hot pots, and rice cake. The bakeries stock Chinese buns, pastries, and other baked goods and desserts such as croissants, egg tarts, fruit Danishes, and kouign-amann. The Capitol Hill location has closed permanently.

Regent has garnered a positive reception for its cakes and pastries. A dessert from the bakery was depicted in the video game Portal, which was published by Bellevue-based Valve Corporation, as a "reward cake", leading to the internet meme "The cake is a lie".

== Description ==
Regent Bakery and Cafe is a family-owned and operated chain of Chinese restaurants and bakeries in the Seattle metropolitan area, in the U.S. state of Washington. The business initially operated in a strip mall in Redmond near Washington State Route 520. A second location opened at the intersection of 14th and Pine Street, on Capitol Hill, and a third followed in Bellevue.

The Capitol Hill location, which has closed permanently, occupied the ground floor of a condominium building and had an "upscale" full bar. Allecia Vermillion of Seattle Metropolitan described the interior as "bright and rather sterile". There was an "extremely sparkly contemporary" chandelier, banquettes, "marble-like" tabletops, and candles. The bar had two large flat-panel displays, glowing bottles, and an abstract image of a drink that changed colors. Marti Jonjak of The Stranger described the restaurant and cocktail lounge as a "sprawling wonderland" lined with windows. The Bellevue shop operates solely as a bakery in the Factoria neighborhood.

=== Menu ===
Regent's cafes serve Chinese cuisine for breakfast, lunch, and dinner; the menu has included: chow fun; hot pots; General Tso's chicken with broccoli; pan-fried dumplings; and pot stickers. Among fried rice varieties is the house special with chicken, barbecued pork, pork sung, and shrimp. The restaurant has also served bok choy, calamari, cooked prawns in a lobster sauce with onions and mushrooms, as well as duck rice cake and mapo tofu.

The bakeries stock a large selection of cakes, as well as Chinese buns and pastries such as barbecued pork buns, croissants, egg tarts, fruit Danishes, and kouign-amann. Other baked goods include cocktail, ham and cheese, and pineapple buns. The green-tea mousse cake has chocolate latticework and high-gloss grapes, kiwi, and strawberries on top. Regent has also sold green-tea cheesecake, oatmeal cookies, bubble tea, and other breads.

== History ==
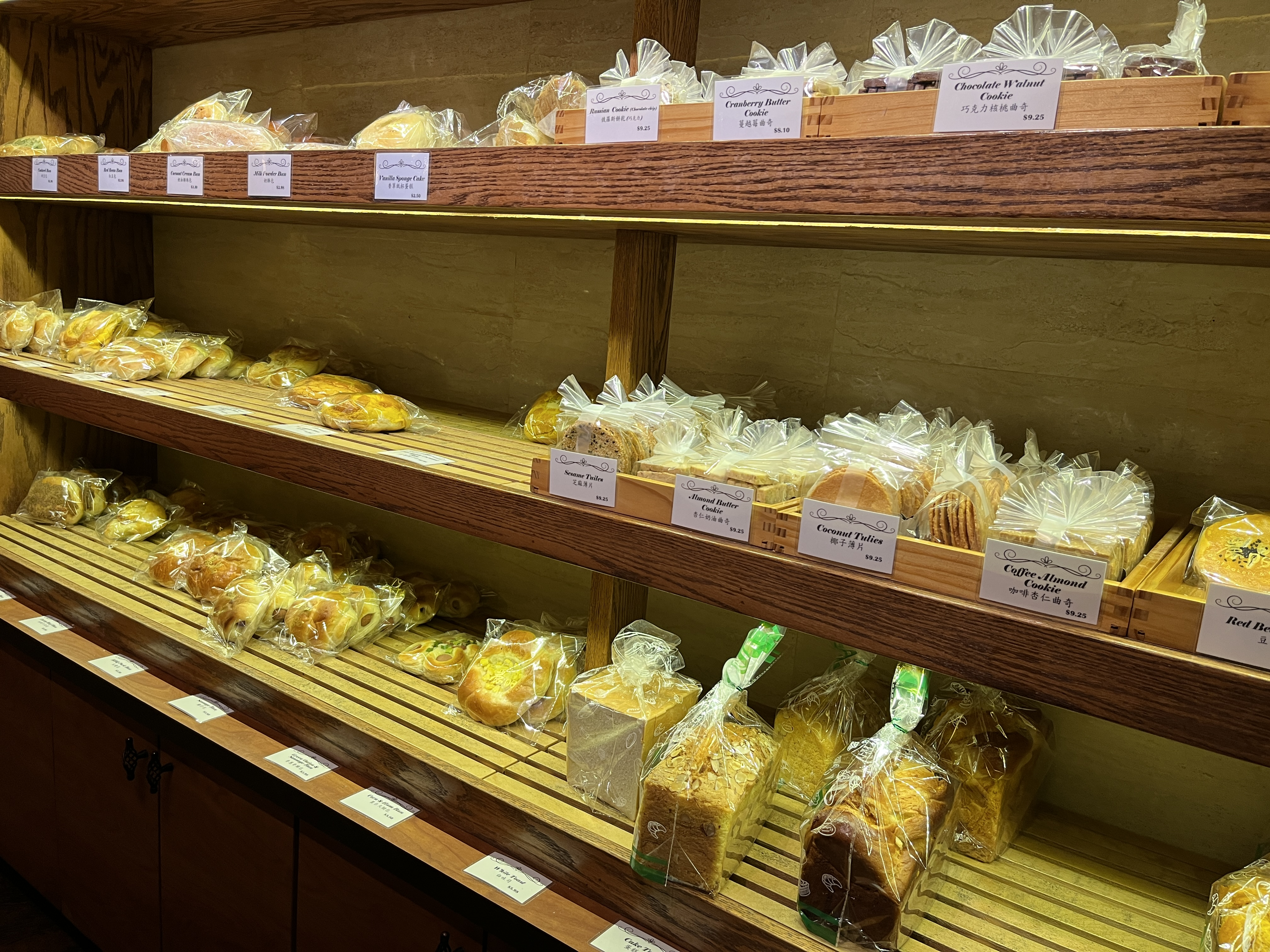
Various baked goods on display at the Capitol Hill location in 2023

Regent was established in 2000. The business is operated by the Loh family, including co-owners Betty, Chris, and Teresa Loh. They initially baked cakes, later expanding the menu to include Chinese dishes.

The Capitol Hill location opened in February 2012, in a space previously occupied by Online Espresso Company. It has since closed permanently and was replaced by the Japanese restaurant Raku Shabu Shabu House in 2025.

== Reception ==
Eater Seattle has called the original cafe a "quaint, unassuming shop". Regent initially gained popularity amongst employees of Microsoft, which is based in Redmond. The restaurant is reportedly "such a favorite" of software developers in the area that a Regent Black Forest cake is depicted in the video game Portal (published by Bellevue-based Valve Corporation) as a "reward cake", leading to the internet meme "The cake is a lie".

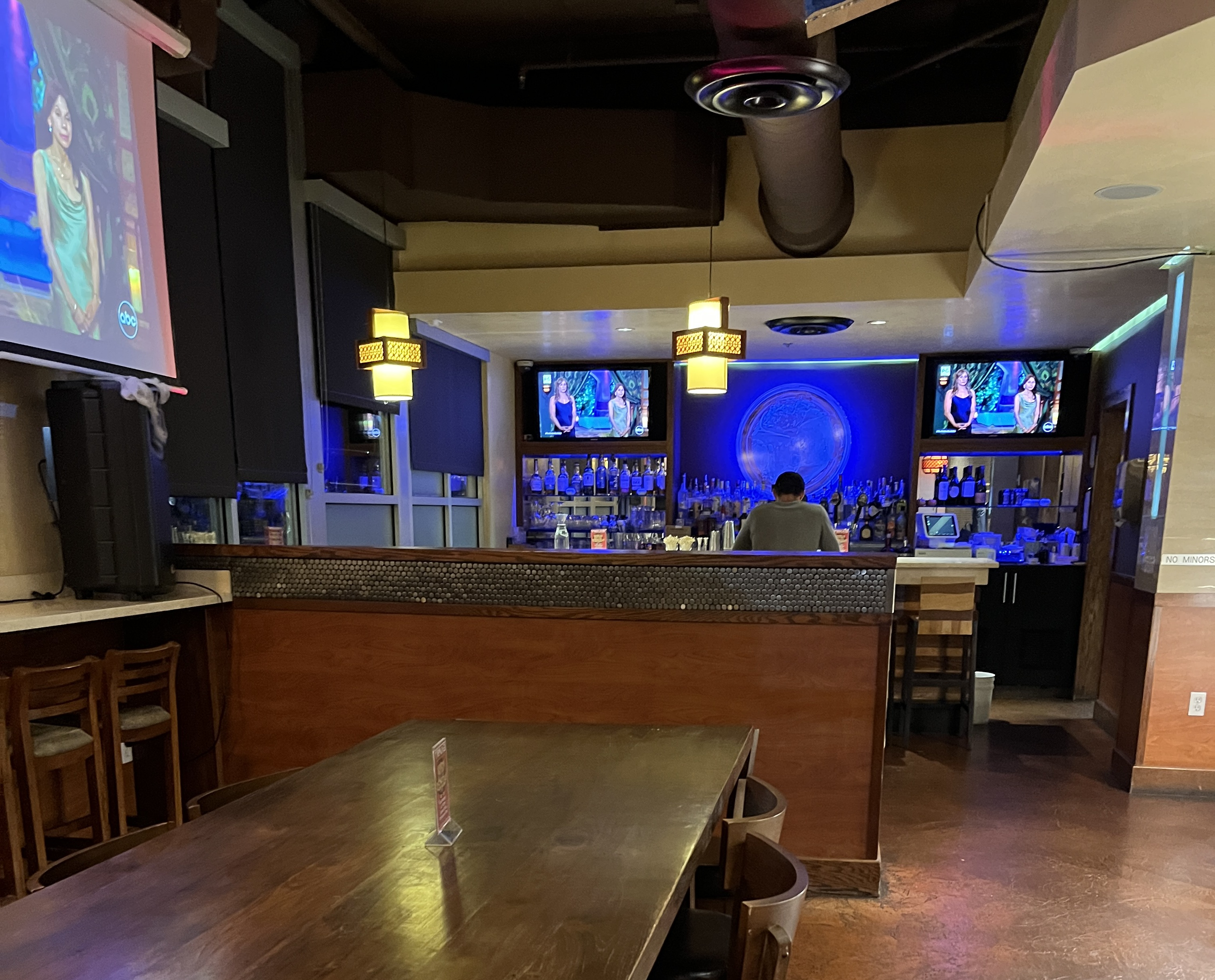
Interior bar at the Capitol Hill location in 2023

In a positive review for The Stranger, Bethany Jean Clement called Regent "slightly weird and entirely wonderful". She said the food was "fresh-tasting and delicious", and predicted long waits during popular hours. Allecia Vermillion of Seattle Metropolitan said Regent offers an "Asia-meets-France" selection of breads, cakes, and pastries, and compared the business to Fuji Bakery. The Seattle Times said the baked goods "are the real deal". In 2018, Naomi Tomky called Regent's barbecued pork bun "the platonic ideal of a classic" in Seattle Magazine's list of the city's best stuffed buns.

In Eater Seattle's 2020 overview of recommended eateries for squid and octopus take-out, Gabe Guarente said the Redmond location has earned a reputation as a "strong" dim sum eatery and wrote that the fried salt and pepper calamari "may be among the best in the city". In the website's 2021 list of fourteen "delightful" dim sum restaurants in the metropolitan area, Leonardo David Raymundo and Ryan Lee praised the Capitol Hill location for its ambiance and pastries, and called Regent's calamari and garlic green beans "as good as you'll find in the city". Eater Seattle's Brett Bankson included Regent in a 2022 list of fourteen "outstanding" restaurants in the Bellevue-Redmond area.

== See also ==
- List of bakeries
- List of Chinese restaurants
- List of restaurant chains in the United States
