= Bridge Constructor Portal =

2017 video game

- Developer: ClockStone
- Publisher: Headup Games
- Composer: Maximilian Stroka
- Series: Bridge Constructor; Portal
- Engine: Unity
- Platforms: Android, iOS, Linux, macOS, Windows, Nintendo Switch, PlayStation 4, Xbox One
- Release: December 20, 2017: Android, iOS, Linux, macOS, Windows; WW: December 20, 2017 Nintendo Switch, PlayStation 4, Xbox One; WW: February 28, 2018
- Genres: Simulation, puzzle
- Mode: Single-player

Bridge Constructor Portal is an engineering simulation and puzzle video game developed by ClockStone and published by Headup Games. The game is part of the Bridge Constructor series, and incorporates elements of Valve's Portal series, taking place in Aperture Laboratories. The game was released on Android, iOS, Linux, macOS and Windows in December 2017, and for the Nintendo Switch, PlayStation 4, and Xbox One in February 2018. By August 2018, the game had sold over 500,000 copies.

== Gameplay ==
Bridge Constructor Portal is an engineering simulation and puzzle video game set in the universe of the Portal series. Players are tasked with designing and constructing bridges to get one or more trucks from one location to another at Aperture Laboratories under the supervision of the artificial intelligence GLaDOS.

The game merges elements from the Bridge Constructor series and Portal series. Players are tasked with building bridges using struts (which can be converted to road segments) and cables, anchored to pre-designated fixed points on the level's walls. The limited availability of fixed points may require the player to construct self-supporting bridges. These bridges must be able to withstand their own weight, as well as the trucks and any force they impart when landing on the bridge. Elements from Portal require the player to guide the trucks across the bridges, navigate through portals, cross over buttons to open doors or other actions, avoid coming in sight of sentry turrets or in contact with deadly fluid or laser fields, and use other Portal gameplay elements like propulsion and repulsion gels and launching pads.

After the bridges have been built, they are subjected to a stress test.

Players can switch between construction mode, test mode, and vehicle mode to visualize their solution. Test mode simulates the physics of the level to see how the bridge components stand up under their own weight. Vehicle mode sends one or more trucks through the player's solution. During either of these, the game shows any struts or cables that are under stress (highlighted in red). If they exceed their stress limit, they will break and cause the bridge to collapse. If the player designs a bridge to successfully allow one vehicle to pass, they can then try to send a convoy of vehicles through the course. These vehicles are released one at a time at regular intervals, and tests to see if the bridge components stand up to repeated stress or if the crossing of paths causes any collisions.

There is no building limit for a level, but each bridge component placed in a solution has a monetary value, and the player is challenged separately to keep the total monetary value as low as possible. The player clears a puzzle by getting one vehicle across, but is rated higher by getting all of the vehicles in a convoy through the course without harm.

== Development and release ==
Bridge Constructor Portal is developed by ClockStone and published by Headup Games. The two studios worked throughout 2017 on a successor to their 2011 video game Bridge Constructor. They partnered with Valve who created and own the Portal series to help with gameplay elements from Portal, art assets, and lore from the Portal series. This includes bringing Ellen McLain to voice GLaDOS for the game.

The game was announced on December 6, 2017. It was released on December 20, 2017, for Android and iOS mobile devices, and for Linux, macOS and Windows-based personal computers. The game was released on Nintendo Switch, PlayStation 4, and Xbox One on February 28, 2018.

The Xbox One and Windows 10 versions are shared between versions as part of Xbox Play Anywhere. This includes sharing not only the save file between versions, but the graphic settings from the Windows 10 version.

== Reception ==
Reception

Aggregate score
Aggregator	Score
Metacritic	(PC) 77/100 (iOS) 86/100 (PS4) 78/100 (XONE) 78/100 (NS) 71/100

Review scores
Publication	Score
Destructoid	7/10
IGN	8/10
PC Gamer (US)	78/100
TouchArcade	4/5
Metro	8/10
GameStar	82/100
PC Games	77/100

Bridge Constructor Portal received "generally favorable" reception, according to review aggregator platform Metacritic. IGN reviewer TJ Hafer found the game to be simple and intuitive while still managing to offer and fulfilling level of depth and challenge. He was slightly disappointed that the portals remained static in the levels and that the game featured no puzzles that involved placing portals. Although he did not think the humor was on par with previous Portal games, he noted that the aesthetics and sound design were reminiscent of those earlier titles. Destructoid writer Jordan Devore agreed that the game was straightforward and that constructing structures was easy to carry out. He found the pacing of the game to be good during the first half but thought it had exhausted introducing new mechanics by the later half, opting to focus on greater complexity and more variables in the puzzles. The game was nominated for "Puzzle" at the 2018 Webby Awards.

By August 2018, the game had sold over 500,000 copies.
