= Bridge Constructor =

Video game series

- Genres: Simulation, puzzle
- Developer: ClockStone
- Publishers: Headup Games; ClockStone (Bridge Constructor Android); Joindots (Playground Wii U)
- Platforms: Android; iOS; Linux; macOS; Meta Quest 3; Microsoft Windows; Nintendo Switch; PlayStation 4; PlayStation 5; PlayStation Vita; Quest 2; Wii U; Windows Phone; Xbox One; Xbox Series X/S; Amazon Luna
- First release: Bridge Constructor; 1 December 2011
- Latest release: Bridge Constructor Studio; 12 December 2024

Bridge Constructor is a series of physics-based simulation-puzzle video games developed by ClockStone and published by Headup Games. While themes and elements change across the series, each game is based on planning out a bridge across a river or ravine using a number of parts, limited by the geometry of the space and the total cost of the parts. The goal for each scenario is to make sure that one or more vehicles driving across the bridge can reach the other side safely.

== History ==
The GIF image that was posted to Reddit that led to the success of Bridge Constructor in North America. It shows the typical gameplay of the series, having constructed a bridge to the stage's limitations by testing that bridge by setting a vehicle (in this case, a tanker-truck) across it.

The first Bridge Constructor game, eponymous to the series, was released for Microsoft Windows on 1 December 2011. While it was generally successful in Europe and topped the app charts there, it was not popular in North America until after a Reddit post by a player of the game within the "GamePhysics" subforum in March 2014. The post showed a GIF-image of a truck barely crossing a bridge as it was collapsing underneath it. This created a large interest in the title, resulting it being the top paid iOS within 10 days of the image's posting. Headup Games took initiative to offer sales on the game and cross-promote the other titles in the series. With the boost in North America, the game saw over 27 million free and paid downloads, and a "good seven-digit figure" in paid sales by March 2014, according to Gregor Ebert of Headup Games.

== Games ==
=== Bridge Constructor Portal (2017) ===
Bridge Constructor Portal was announced in December 2017, for release on mobile and personal computers later that same month, and for consoles in 2018. Developed under license from Valve, the game sets challenges in the Aperture Laboratory facilities from the Portal series, under the watchful eye of the artificial intelligence GLaDOS. The game uses the same core gameplay of earlier titles, but with elements from the Portal series, such as the portals, turrets, and other features.

=== Bridge Constructor: The Walking Dead (2020) ===
Bridge Constructor: The Walking Dead was announced in August 2020 at Gamescom and released on 19 November 2020.

=== Bridge Constructor Studio (2024) ===
Bridge Constructor Studio was announced in October 2024 and released on December 12, 2024 for Meta Quest 2 and 3, with PC, mobile and console releases following on July 17, 2025.
