= The cake is a lie =

Internet meme from the video game Portal

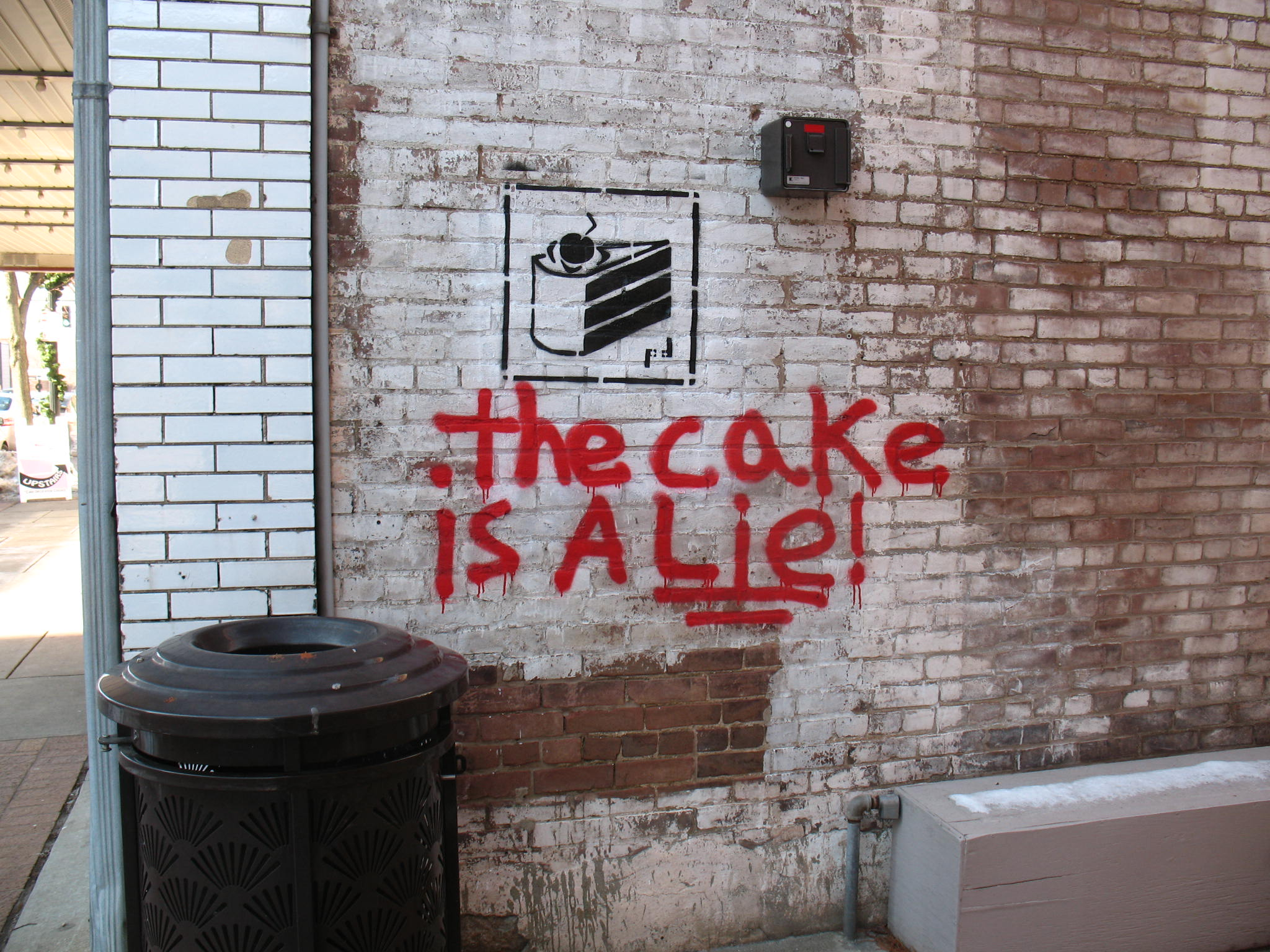
Wall graffiti in Urbana, Illinois, which references the catchphrase and cake slice iconography from Portal

"The cake is a lie" is a catchphrase from the 2007 video game Portal. Initially left behind as graffiti by Doug Rattmann to warn that GLaDOS, the game's main villain, was deceiving the player, it was intended to be a minor reference and esoteric joke by the game's development team that implied the player would never receive their promised reward. It became unexpectedly popular among Portal players, and has since become a widely distributed Internet meme where the phrase is co-opted and becomes associated with new meanings outside of the original context of the game.

== Usage ==
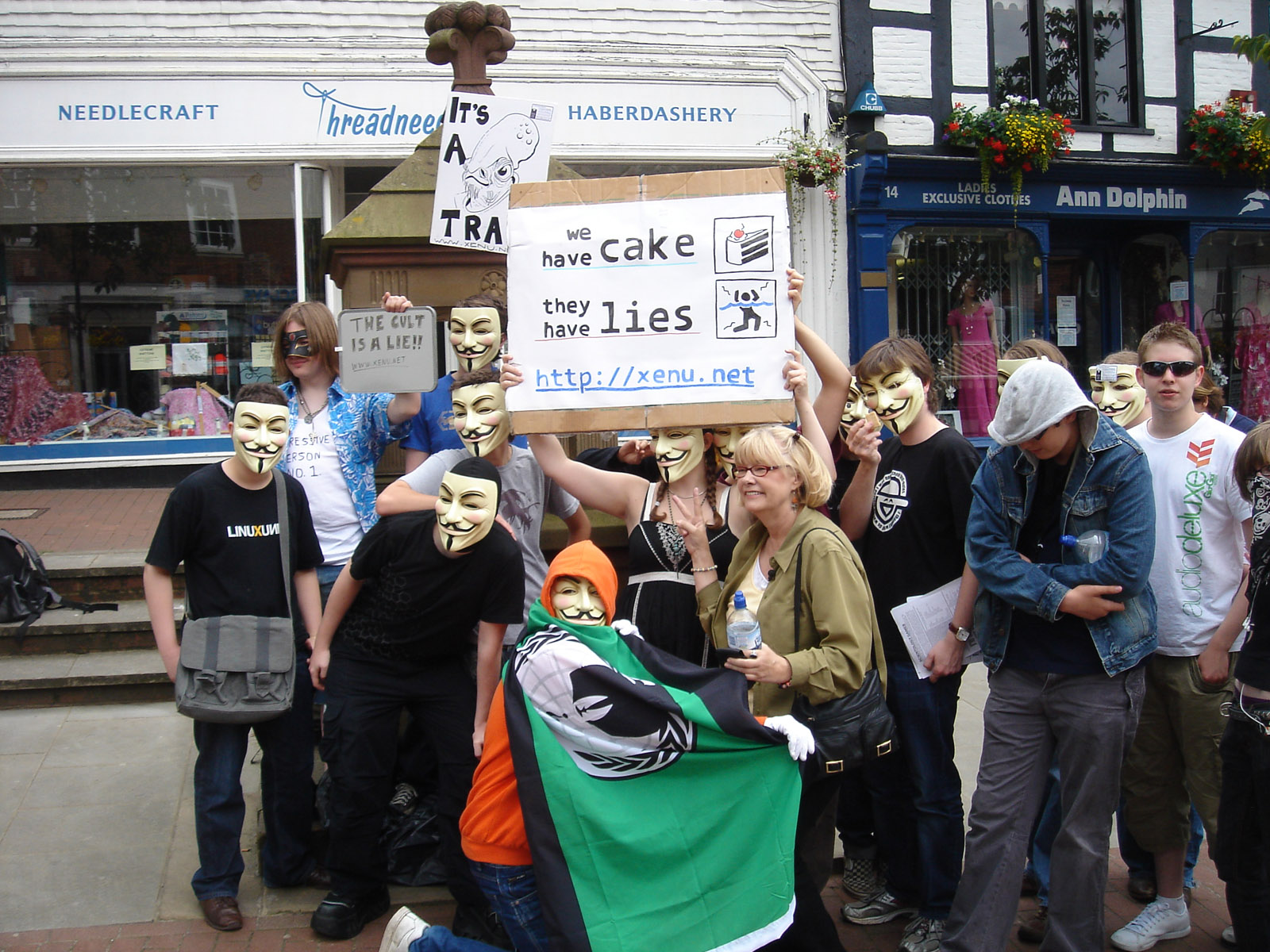
An example of the original phrase being modified and used in entirely different contexts by members of Operation Clambake

The original context of "The cake is a lie" was to convey the message that a reward is being used to motivate Chell, the player character of Portal, without any intent of delivering. Early use of the phrase among Portal fans indicated a wry state of knowing; it represented a shared experience, and a way to flag down false sources of motivation.

The phrase eventually became far removed from its original context and purchase through repeated use in Internet culture. For example, the phrase has been used as an idiom to refer to the pursuit of an empty, unattainable goal, or as a reference point in discussing protests about the flaws of the British education system's algorithm by a research academic. "The cake is a lie" is also used to refer to actual cakes, whether as fan art which references Portal, or as a literal descriptor of cakes which are designed as lifelike replicas of people and objects.

== Origin ==
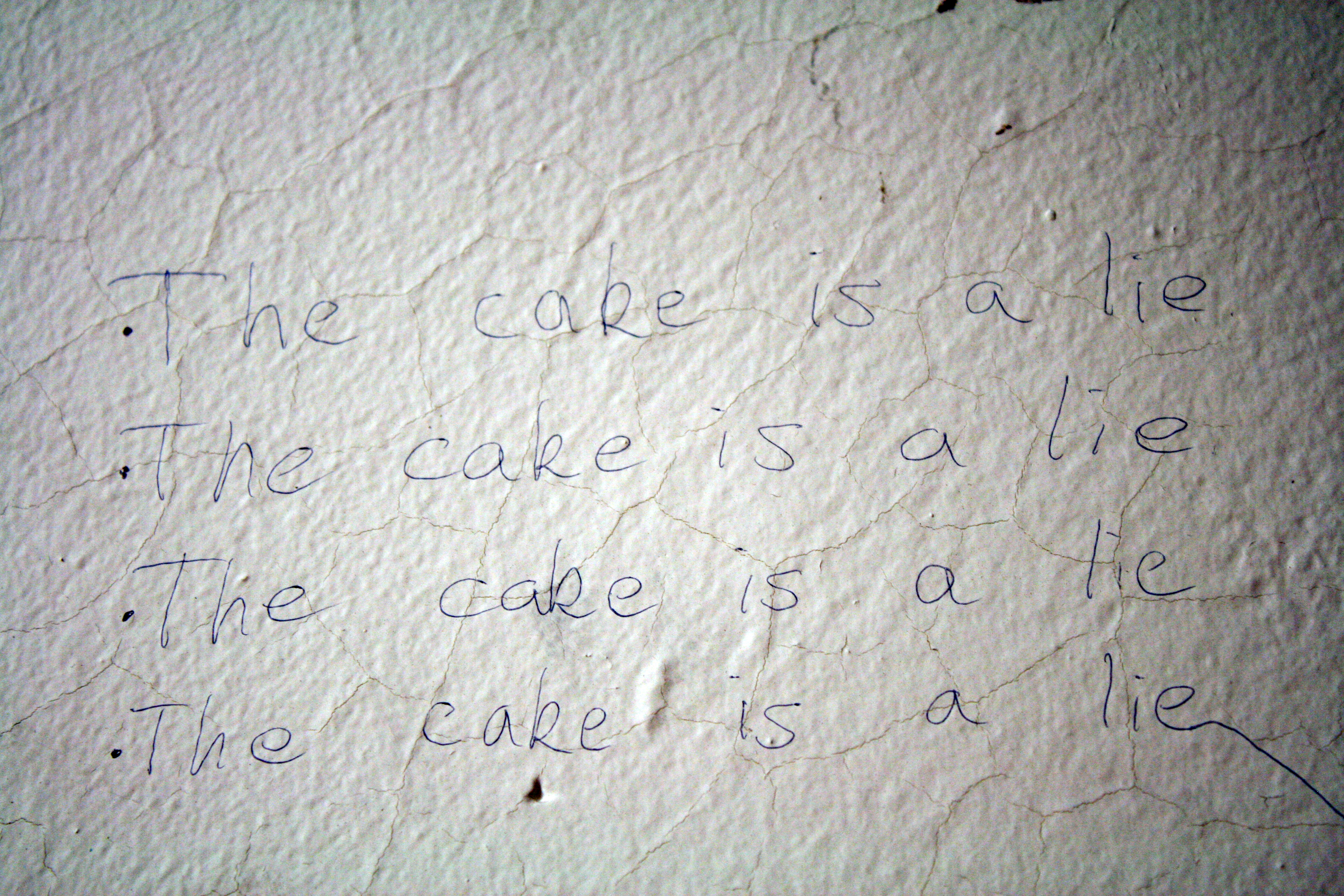
A ballpoint pen recreation of "The cake is a lie" graffiti. In the videogame Portal, the message is drawn in thick, inked letters on bare concrete walls.

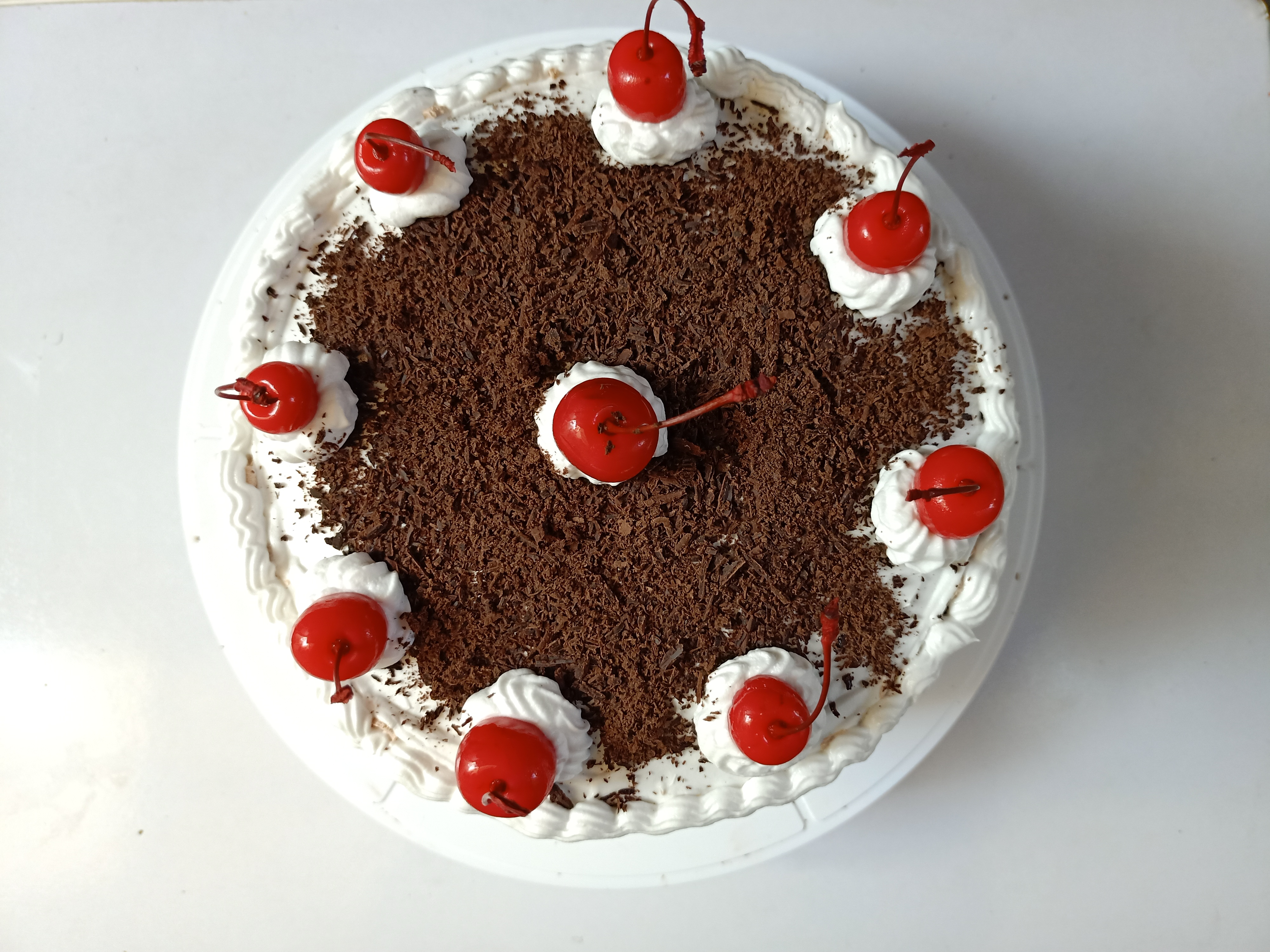
A Black Forest gateau, the type of cake that features in the game

The phrase first appears in the 2007 video game Portal. It can be found scribbled in an unhinged manner within hidden cubby-holes throughout the test chambers that players must complete, with the phrase written multiple times by the last surviving scientist of Aperture Science neurotoxin incident, Doug Rattmann. It is in reference to the fact that an AI entity that guides Chell through the chambers, GLaDOS, promises cake as a reward if she accomplishes all of the test chambers. However, GLaDOS turns out to be duplicitous, and Rattmann left the message as a warning. The cake is referred to in lyrics of the song featured in the game's closing credits, "Still Alive".

Portal writers Erik Wolpaw and Chet Faliszek developed the phrase as a plot device, "a thematic anchor that offers a chuckle or two in its setup, reveal, and post-credits wink" with no consideration given for its potential to become a viral phenomenon, as Wolpaw and Faliszek had anticipated that an innocuous hoop that falls from the sky after the player character escapes the exploding facility would catch on with fans instead. The idea of using cake as the proposed reward came about at the beginning of the Portal development process, where the writers convened as a group to determine which philosopher or school of philosophy their game would be based on. A consensus was reached when a team member suggested that a lot of people like cake.

The cake element, along with additional messages given to the player in the behind-the-scenes areas, were written and drawn by Kim Swift. The cake is a Black Forest gateau, with its design based on a cake from the Redmond location of the Regent Bakery and Cafe near Valve's offices.

== Spread ==
"The cake is a lie" became frequently quoted on numerous message board forums and blogs across the Internet. Don Caldwell, managing editor at the website Know Your Meme, said catchphrase memes like "the cake is a lie" are easily spread across the Internet and have a very low barrier to entry for participation in their proliferation.

Interest in the phrase waned in early 2009 before it experienced a revival in popularity on July 6 of the same year, which Caldwell attributed to an xkcd comic referencing the phrase. Tyler Wilde from GamesRadar noted that "The cake is a lie" became one of the most repeated video game quotes by the year 2009. Stephen Totillo, who was an editor at MTV.com in 2008, attributed part of Portal's widespread acclaim to the phrase, along with its theme song, "Still Alive", and the Weighted Companion Cube. James Davenport from PC Gamer formed the view that a pivotal contributing factor to the meme's popularity was due to the year it debuted in, 2007, "in which some of the most legendary memes gained notoriety and cemented themselves near the head of the wacky, inexplicable semiotics parade". Amanda Brennan agreed and suggest that 2007 marked a point where internet culture transcended from niche forums such as 4chan and entered into "its own ecosystem", attaining mainstream appeal in the process.

Usage of the phrase in popular culture experienced a resurgence in the year 2020 in response to the spread on social media of another cake-based meme, where it is used as a literal description of a hyper-realistic cake being made to look like something else.

In January 2025, the phrase saw a renewed resurgence of use after Hollow Knight: Silksong developer William Pellen changed his Twitter profile picture to a piece of cake, alongside other changes, which appeared to relate to April 2nd, leading some to believe that they were hints to Silksong news on that date. This was later denied, with the deconfirmation ending with "The cake was a lie."

=== Depictions in popular culture ===
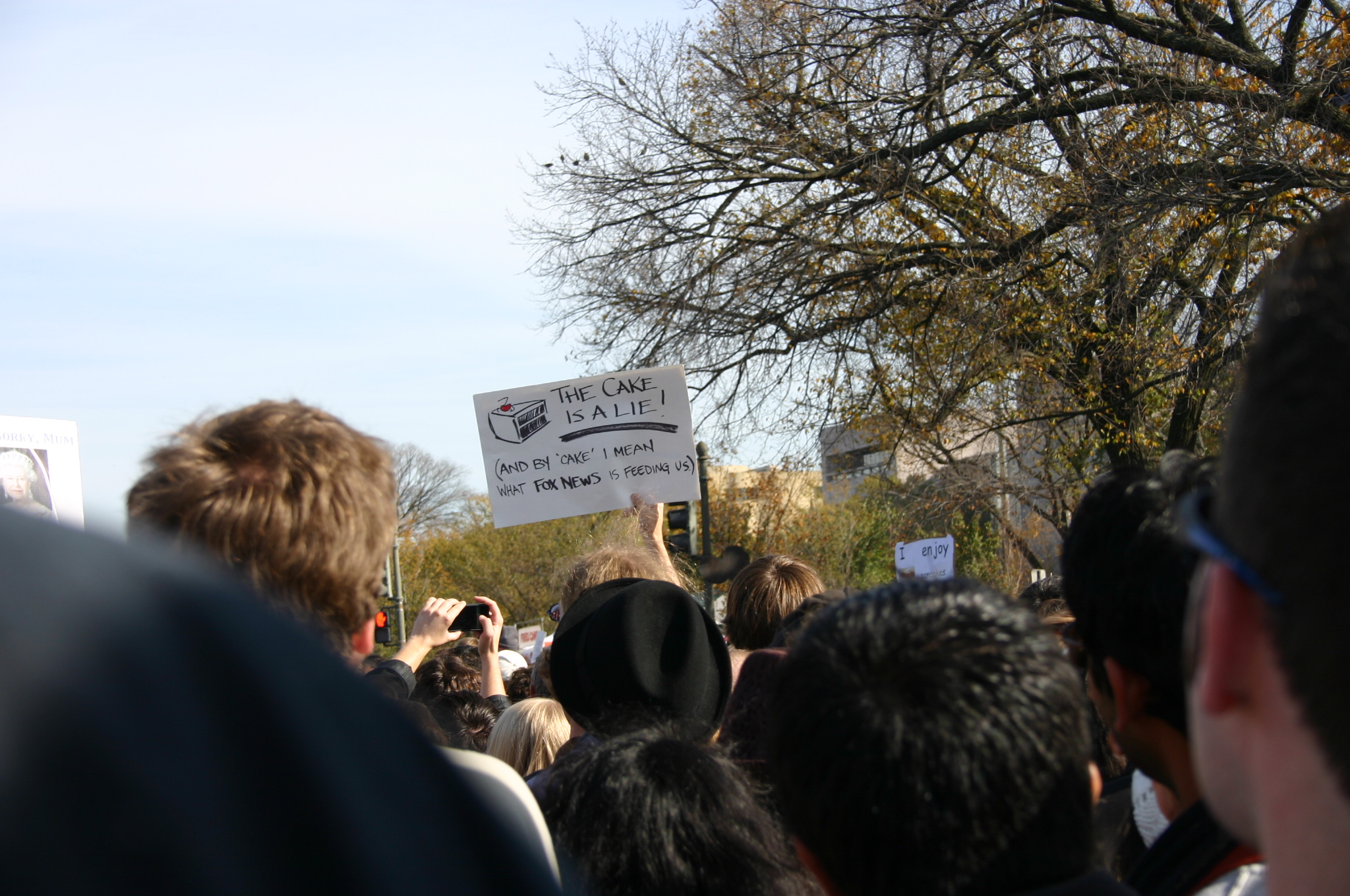
A picket sign at the Rally to Restore Sanity and/or Fear which references the phrase to criticize an American cable news television channel

The meme has been referenced in fan films, as well as discussions about other video games by video game journalists or as an Easter egg within the game itself. Examples include 'Splosion Man, Dragon Age: Origins, World of Warcraft,Assassin's Creed: Valhalla, and Minecraft.

The phrase has also been encountered in other contexts. It was featured on a sticker posted at an anti-Scientology demonstration in front of the London Scientology Office in March 2008. A KJRH-TV story which focused on Sooner Paranormal of Oklahoma, a group dedicated to "paranormal investigations and research", depicted a group member walking through a supposedly haunted building and discovering the phrase scrawled on a chalkboard, with the implication that the scrawling had paranormal or unusual origins.

References to the Portal cake have been used in various forms of merchandising, both official and unofficial. The phrase has also been used frequently as a reference in Internet culture about actual cakes since the release of Portal.

== Reaction ==
Video game journalists have praised the presentation of "The cake is a lie" in Portal as a well-executed example of environmental storytelling. Ars Technica editor Johnathan Neuis said that "the cake is a lie" was one of the strongest inside jokes in gaming since "All your base are belong to us". Mashable ranked "The cake is a lie" as the most unforgettable gaming meme of the 2000s. The Regent Bakery noted that since the release of the game, its Black Forest cake had become one of its more popular items.

Conversely, The Escapist editor Ben "Yahtzee" Croshaw criticized the overuse of Internet memes, specifically mentioning the usage of the phrase as an easter egg reference in 'Splosion Man. He criticized people who use Internet memes to give themselves a personality, and argued that "The cake is a lie" was hardly the funniest thing in Portal.

In a 2010 interview with Gamasutra about Portal 2, Wolpaw indicated that no jokes or references to cake would be made for the then-upcoming game as he was "sick of the memes". Valve said that they intended to cease promotion of the catchphrase as humor that same year, though an officially licensed cake mix for the Portal brand was created by German licensee Gaya Entertainment and released in 2013. Wolpaw said in interviews about Portal 2 that the joke had been "retired", but that "some geeky artist might have buried a cake reference in there somewhere". Portal 2 features two overt references to cake. The first is in a mural depicting the events of Portal and the Portal: Lab Rat comic, a section of which shows GLaDOS offering Chell cake. The second occurs when GLaDOS tricks the player with a fake door labelled "GLaDOS Emergency Shutdown and Cake Dispensary". The recipe for cake is also among the gibberish that may be featured on computer monitors scattered throughout the game.

== See also ==
- Jam tomorrow – Expression for a never-fulfilled promise
- "The Preacher and the Slave" – Song by Joe Hill
