= Fuji Bakery =

Bakery in the U.S. state of Washington

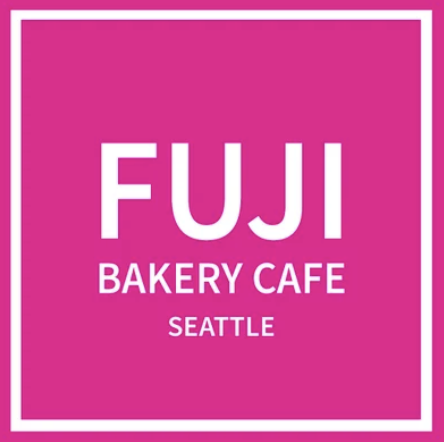

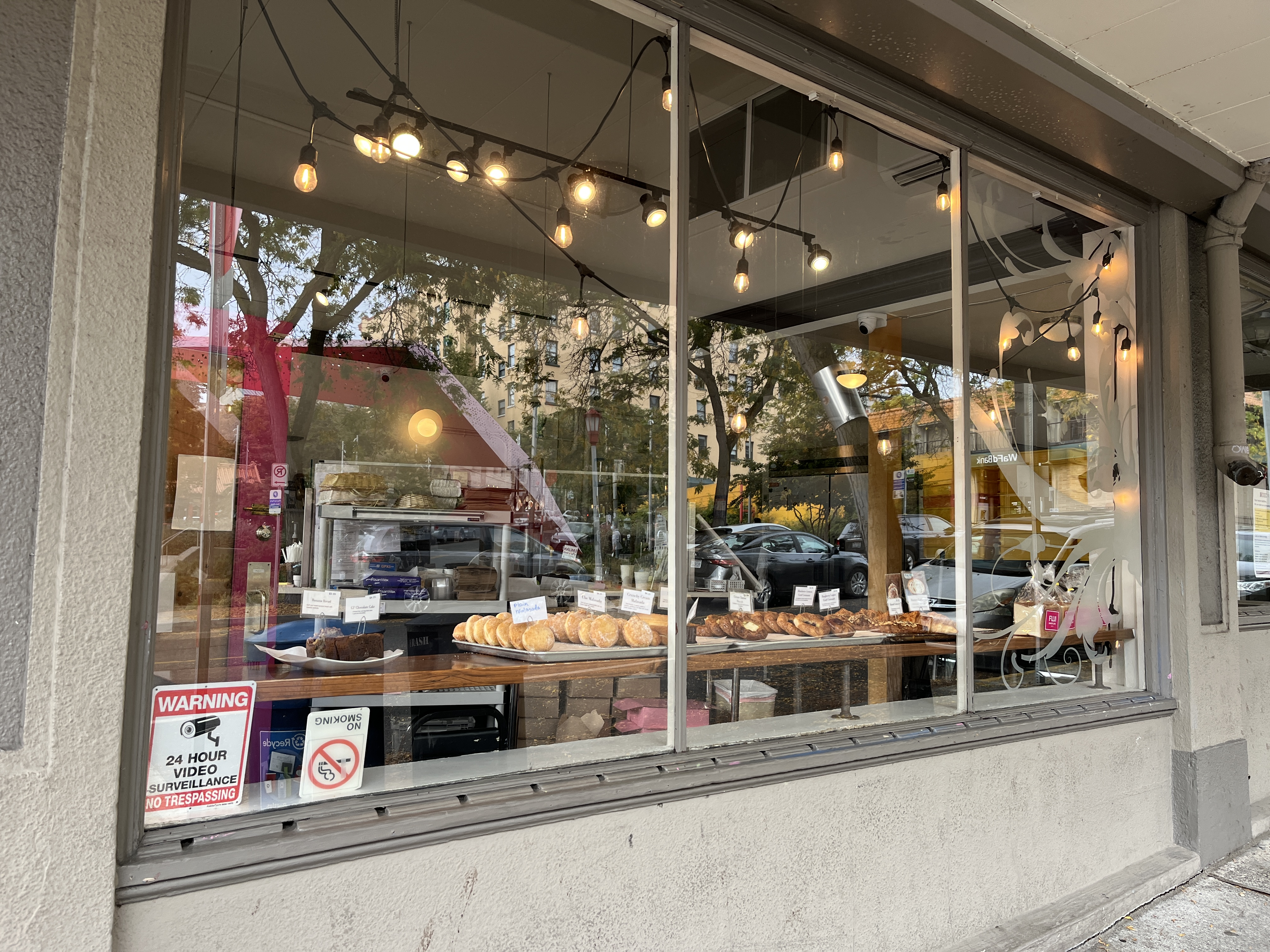
- Exterior of the bakery in Seattle's Chinatown–International District, 2022

Restaurant information
- Established: May 2009
- Owner: Susien Lee
- Previous owner: Akihiro Nakamura
- Location: Washington, United States
- Website: fujibakeryinc.com

Fuji Bakery is a bakery with multiple locations in the Seattle metropolitan area, in the U.S. state of Washington.

== Description ==
The bakery has served brioche and mochi doughnuts, blueberry Danish, lemon teacake, and other Japanese- and French-inspired baked goods. The business has also served fondant chocolate, curry buns, pastel de nata, and chocolate covered orange slices.

The Bellevue bakery is located in a Uwajimaya store.

== History ==
Originally opened in 2009 by Akihiro Nakamura, it was sold in 2017 to Susien Lee who now owns the business. Fuji Bakery was a vendor at the Chinatown–International District's annual Dragon Fest in 2013.

One location was burglarized in late 2020. The Chinatown-International District location was vandalized multiple times in 2022.

== Reception ==
Chona Kasinger included the bakery in Thrillist's 2014 list of "The 15 best places to eat in Seattle's International District". Chelsea Lin and Naomi Tomky included Fuji in Seattle magazine's 2018 list of "The 5 Best Bakeries in Seattle". Jay Friedman included the business in Eater Seattle's 2022 list of "19 Knockout Restaurants in Seattle’s Chinatown-International District". Fuji was included in The Infatuation's 2025 list of the 25 best restaurants in the Chinatown–International District.

== See also ==
- List of bakeries
- List of restaurant chains in the United States
