= Grant Tavinor =

Academic and philosopher of video games

- Born: 1973
- Died: August 13, 2025 (aged 51–52)

Academic background
- Education: University of Auckland

Academic work
- Discipline: philosophy
- Sub-discipline: philosophy of art
- Institutions: Lincoln University
- Notable works: The Art of Videogames

Grant Tavinor (1973 – August 13, 2025) was a New Zealand academic and philosopher of art. Tavinor wrote about the aesthetics, philosophy, and ethics of digital technology, videogames and virtual reality. His book The Art of Videogames (2009) is considered a foundational work in the field. Tavinor was a Senior Lecturer in Philosophy at Lincoln University where he taught from 2003-2025, and an Erskine Fellow at the University of Canterbury in 2022.

== Early life and education ==
Tavinor was born in Whangarei. He attended the University of Otago in Dunedin, New Zealand, where he received a BA(Hons), and the University of Auckland in Auckland, New Zealand, where he completed his PhD.

== Career ==
Tavinor joined Lincoln University in New Zealand as a Lecturer in Philosophy in 2003. Tavinor was promoted to Senior Lecturer in 2014, remaining in this position in the Faculty of Environment, Society and Design until his death in 2025. He was an Erskine Fellow at the University of Canterbury in 2022.

Tavinor served on Lincoln University's Human Ethics Committee for 14 years, chairing the committee from 2014-2024. He received the Vice-Chancellor's "Recognition of Service" award for his contributions.

== Works ==
Tavinor's first book, The Art of Videogames (2009) is considered a foundational work in the aesthetics of videogames. In it he argued that video games are a new form of representational art, providing "an active exploratory aesthetics" involving "the representation of the player, their agency, and their aesthetic experiences, within a fictional world." He addressed the philosophical questions of "What is a game?" and "What is art?", considering videogames in terms of fiction, narrative, emotion, and morality. Giving videogames a conceptual foundation, Tavinor defined them disjunctively:

“X is a videogame if it is an artifact in a visual digital medium, is intended as an object of entertainment, and is intended to provide such entertainment through the employment of one or both of the following modes of engagement: rule and objective gameplay or interactive fiction.”

Tavinor edited the first anthology of essays on videogame aesthetics, The Aesthetics of Videogames (2018), with Jon Robson. He also wrote The Aesthetics of Virtual Reality (2021).
