= Cold beet soup =

Soup traditional in Eastern Europe

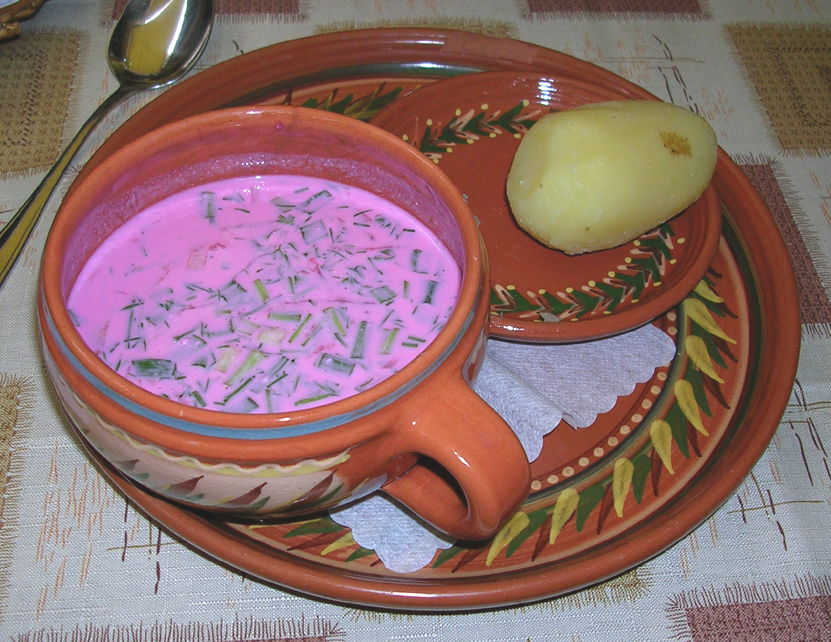
- Cold beet soup
- Type: Soup
- Place of origin: Grand Duchy of Lithuania / Polish–Lithuanian Commonwealth
- Region or state: Eastern Europe
- Associated cuisine: Belarusian cuisine, Latvian cuisine, Lithuanian cuisine, Polish cuisine, Ukrainian cuisine
- Main ingredients: Beetroot or sorrel, kefir, soured milk or kvass, cucumbers, greens, eggs

Cold beet soup (Belarusian: халаднік, romanized: chaladnik; Latvian: aukstā zupa, lit. 'cold soup'; Lithuanian: šaltibarščiai, lit. 'cold borscht'; Polish: chłodnik litewski, lit. 'Lithuanian cold soup'; Ukrainian: холодник, romanized: kholodnyk) is a cold summer soup found in the cuisines of Belarus, Lithuania, Latvia, Poland and Ukraine. It is historically associated with the culinary traditions of the Grand Duchy of Lithuania and the later Polish–Lithuanian Commonwealth, where cold sour soups were common across the entire social strata, from the nobility to the peasants. Svekolnik is a related cold beet soup in Russian cuisine, commonly made with bread kvass or beetroot kvass.

The dish has several regional and national forms. In modern Lithuanian cuisine, the beetroot-and-kefir version known as šaltibarščiai is especially prominent and is widely regarded as one of the country's best-known summer dishes. In Polish cuisine, the name chłodnik litewski historically referred to a regional style associated with the lands of the former Grand Duchy of Lithuania. In Belarusian cuisine, it is known as chaladnik and is well attested in 18th- and 19th-century ethnographic materials as a traditional and widespread summer dish. Related cold beet or sour summer soups are also present in Latvian and Ukrainian cuisines.

The cold beet soup's recipe ingredients historically vary by region, season, and social context. Noble-household recipes included more elaborate additions, while rural versions were generally simpler and based on seasonal produce and fermented liquids.

Since 2023, an annual cold beet soup festival has been held in Vilnius, which reflects the exceptional importance of šaltibarščiai in Lithuanian public food culture and culinary tourism.

== Preparation ==
Modern cold beet soup is commonly prepared from boiled and cooled beetroot, which is peeled and grated or chopped. Fresh cucumbers are diced or sliced, and green onions, dill, or other herbs are finely chopped. The vegetables are mixed with cold water, kefir, soured milk, buttermilk, or a combination of these liquids. Vinegar, lemon juice, beet kvass, or bread kvass may be added for acidity.

A hard-boiled egg, halved or chopped, is often added before serving. The soup is served cold, often garnished with dill or sour cream. Boiled potatoes, rye bread, or other simple accompaniments may be served separately.

A related variant is made with sorrel. Other traditional variants use beet greens, young beetroot leaves, bread kvass, beet kvass, or soured milk.

== History ==
Cold beet soup developed within the shared culinary space of the former Grand Duchy of Lithuania (hence the name "Lithuanian") and the Polish–Lithuanian Commonwealth. This area included Lithuania, much of modern Belarus, parts of Latvia, eastern Poland, and Ukraine.

=== Early recipes ===
One of the earliest known recipes for a dish called chłodnik was recorded in Warsaw by Paul Tremo, head chef to King Stanisław August Poniatowski, at the end of the 18th century.

Another early account was left by military doctor Jan Drozdowski, who described life in Biała-Radziwiłłowska, now Biała Podlaska, at the end of the 18th century. In his memoirs, Drozdowski wrote that he first tasted a cold soup prepared by a local woman, who called it chołodec. He noted that the dish was also known as chłodnik and, among common people, as boćwina. The version prepared for a noble household included crayfish tails, sour cream, and other additions.

In the 19th century, cold beet soup was widely represented in regional cookbooks and ethnographic descriptions. Jan Szyttler, a cook and culinary writer active in Vilnius, included several recipes for cold soups in his works. One of his later books, published in Vilnius in 1848, included chłodnik among the characteristic dishes of the region.

In Wincenta Zawadzka's Kucharka litewska, first published in Vilnius in 1854, cold beet soup appears as a local regional specialty. Her recipe reflected the cuisine of wealthier households, while simpler rural versions used more readily available products.

A further example of the dish's regional spread is found in Kucharka szlachecka, published in Zhytomyr in 1878 by Maria Marciszewska, who described herself as a "Lithuanian living in Ukraine". Her recipe appeared under the double name "Lithuanian cold soup, or Ukrainian cold soup" (Chłodnik litewski czyli chłodziec ukraiński), illustrating the regional character of the dish. Marciszewska also recorded a Lenten cold beet soup recipe, as consuming sour cream and meat was forbidden during fasting periods, crayfish tails and olive oil were used instead, and the dish itself was whitened with plant-based milk:

...rozprowadzić parzonym z mąki i przegotowanym zimnym kwasem, zabielić mlekiem zrobionym z włoskich suszonych orzechów, ale tego mleka cedzić nie trzeba tylko orzechy utłuc i trochę wodą rozprowadzić, dodać parę łyżek dobrej oliwy; można zabielić mlekiem makowém.

[...dilute with cold kvass brewed from flour and boiled, whiten with milk made from dried walnuts, but this milk does not need to be strained, just crush the nuts and dilute slightly with water, add a couple of spoons of good olive oil; it can also be whitened with poppy seed milk.]

— Maria Marciszewska, 1878

Cold beet soup was also known outside the region through cookbooks. In the 1842 edition of A New System of Domestic Cookery by Mary Eliza Rundell, edited by Emma Roberts, several "Polish" recipes were added, including a cold beet soup.

== In literature and memoirs ==
Cold beet soup appears in several 19th-century memoirs and literary works connected with the lands of the former Grand Duchy of Lithuania.

The German physician Johann Peter Frank, a Vilnius University professor, described being served a cold soup with ice in 1805 during a visit to Nyasvizh to see Prince Michał Hieronim Radziwiłł.

Stanisław Morawski recalled a visit to the Navahrudak region in 1815, where hosts served several soups at one dinner, including cold beet soup.

The dish is also mentioned in Adam Mickiewicz's epic poem Pan Tadeusz, whose action takes place in the Navahrudak region. In the poem, cold beet soup appears as part of the culinary landscape of the former Grand Duchy of Lithuania.

Memoirs of Gabriela Puzynina also show the dish as a marker of regional memory. While in Warsaw, she associated cold beet soup with her homeland, and during a picnic at Puławy in 1825 her family brought the dish as a regional speciality.

== Ethnographic descriptions ==
Ethnographic sources from the 19th century describe cold beet soup and related cold sour soups as part of everyday summer food in the region.

Adam Kirkor's "Ethnographic View on the Vilna Governorate" (1857), summer food is described as including bread kvass and kholodyec or kholodnik, prepared with steamed greens, light kvass, salt, and milk.

Zinaida Radchenko, in her study Gomel Folk Songs (1888), listed cold beet soup among the main summer soups eaten in the Gomel region.

The ethnographer Pavel Shein described chaladnik in the daily life of northeastern Belarus at the end of the 19th century. According to his description, the soup could be made from sorrel, ground elder, and beet tops, diluted with kvass, and supplemented with seasonal ingredients.

Local traditions from the Lida region also preserve references to the dish. The local historian Michał Szymielewicz recorded a rhyme connected with Saint George's Day in which chaladnik appears as a familiar seasonal food.

Later recollections from the Lida region describe a simple household version made from soured milk, cucumber, and dill. Such accounts show that, alongside elaborate noble recipes, cold soups of this type remained part of everyday rural cuisine.

== Cultural significance ==
Cold beet soup remains a recognisable summer dish in several Eastern European cuisines. It is known in Belarusian, Latvian, Lithuanian, Polish, and Ukrainian traditions, with distinct modern forms in each cuisine. It is particularly prominent in modern Lithuanian cuisine, where šaltibarščiai has become a widely known national dish and an element of culinary branding.

Contemporary debates about the attribution of cold beet soup often reflect modern national identities. Historically, however, the dish is usually understood as part of the shared culinary heritage of the former Grand Duchy of Lithuania and the Polish–Lithuanian Commonwealth, with later developments in several national cuisines. As a result of which the Vilnius Pink Soup Fest is an annual cultural and tourism festival held in Lithuania. Organized by Go Vilnius (the official tourism and business development agency of Vilnius), the event celebrates šaltibarščiai, Lithuania's iconic cold beetroot soup.

== See also ==
- Belarusian cuisine
- Latvian cuisine
- Lithuanian cuisine
- Polish cuisine
- Ukrainian cuisine
- Beetroot
- Borscht
- Botvinya
- Cold soup
- Kefir
- Kvass
- Okroshka

== Bibliography ==
- "Халаднік". Беларуская энцыклапедыя: У 18 т. [Belarusian Encyclopedia: In 18 vol.] (in Belarusian). Vol. 16. Мінск: Беларуская Энцыклапедыя. 2003. p. 527.
- Лаўрэш, Л. Л. (13 May 2026). Наш халаднік [Our chaladnik]. Наша слова (in Belarusian) (19 (229)).
- Радченко, З. Ф. (1888). Записки Императорскаго Русскаго Географическаго Общества по отдѣленію этнографіи Гомельскія народныя пѣсни (бѣлорусскія и малорусскія) [Gomel folk songs (Belarusian and Little Russian)] (in Russian). Vol. XIII. С.-Петербургъ. pp. 1–326.
