= Vilnius Pink Soup Fest =

Annual festival in Vilnius, Lithuania

Vilnius Pink Soup Fest Vilniaus šaltibarščių festivalis
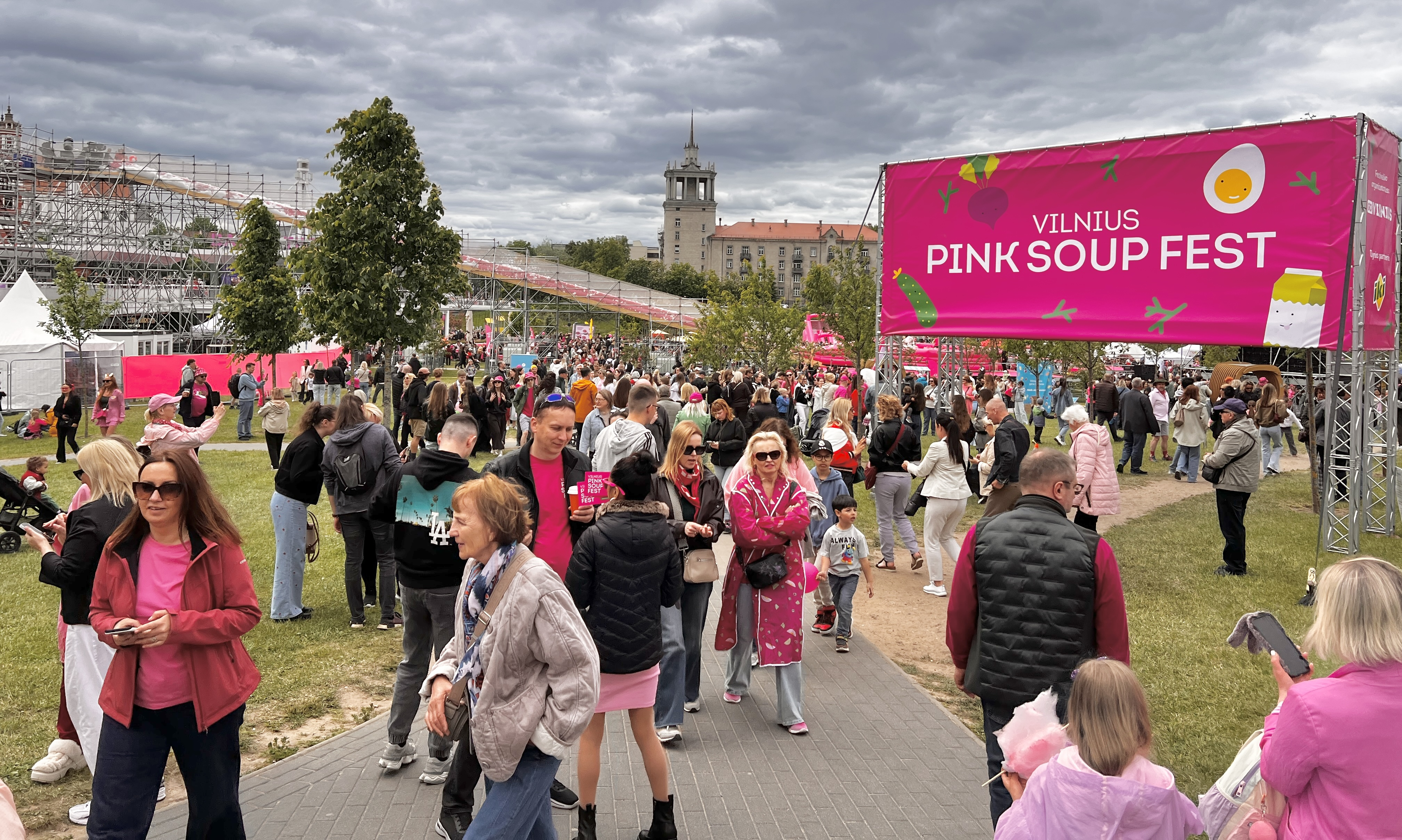
- People walking on the festival ground near the White Bridge (2026)
- Status: recurring, active
- Genre: festivals
- Dates: end of May, beginning of June
- Frequency: annually
- Location: Vilnius
- Country: Lithuania
- Inaugurated: 11 June 2023
- Most recent: 31 May 2026
- Attendance: 176,000
- Website: www.govilnius.lt/pink-soup-fest

The Vilnius Pink Soup Fest (Lithuanian: Vilniaus šaltibarščių festivalis) is an annual food and cultural festival held in Vilnius, Lithuania, in late spring. The festival celebrates šaltibarščiai, a cold beetroot soup widely regarded as one of Lithuania's national dishes.

It is organised by Go Vilnius, the official tourism and business development agency of the city of Vilnius. During this free festival, the city centre is decorated in pink and the visitors are also encouraged to wear pink clothes or accessories. The programme includes activities such as soup tastings, parades, costume contests, concerts, sport events, and themed installations.

== Background ==
Šaltibarščiai is a cold soup traditionally made from beetroot, kefir, cucumber, dill, and boiled eggs, that is often served with hot boiled potatoes. The soup's distinctive bright pink colour has made it a recognisable symbol of Lithuanian cuisine.

According to the organisers, the festival was conceived as a way to promote the dish internationally and to strengthen local pride in Lithuanian culinary heritage, which had been suppressed and standardised during the Soviet occupation.

== Editions ==
The first edition of the Vilnius Pink Soup Fest was held on 11 June 2023, in the year that Vilnius celebrated the 700th anniversary of its founding. It was a one-day event around Tymo Market and Kūdrų Park, near Užupis, and involved more than 80 participating businesses. Attractions included a 50 metre long pink slide down a hill ending in a giant inflatable "soup bowl". 15,000 people attended this first edition.

The second edition, held on 1 June 2024, drew an estimated 42,000 attendees. It featured a 362 metre long table at which around 1,200 guests gathered in an attempt to set a record for the longest cold beet soup table. In addition, a shared "pink soup table" connected Vilnius with the Polish city of Lublin via the real-time Vilnius–Lublin Portal.

Organised on 31 May 2025, the third edition attracted 93,000 visitors, including 17,000 from abroad. The programme included the Pink Soup Parade, a walking challenge, and the "Pink Waiters' Run" during which waiters had to run with a plate of soup. In the evening, a concert took place on Town Hall Square with the bands Black Biceps, The Roop, and singer Justinas Jarutis. In 2025, Lithuanian Railways introduced, for the first time, a pink summer train service linking Vilnius and Mockava.

Following this growth in attendance, the organisers expanded the festival to three days for the fourth edition, which was held from 29 to 31 May 2026. New elements included a synchronised citywide "Pink Break" lunch, the first pink boat parade on the Neris River, a dedicated Pink Soup Bus, and the temporary rebranding of Vilnius Airport as the "Vilnius Pinkternational Beetport". The programme also included free concerts by Donatas Montvydas and others. The fourth edition attracted more than 176,000 visitors, of which around 33,000 came from abroad.

The festival brings together companies and organizations from across Lithuania. Participants present their activities, organize educational and entertainment programmes for children and adults, hold competitions, and provide prizes.

A separate food area is also set up at the festival, where visitors can purchase both traditional Lithuanian dishes and more experimental foods created specifically for the event. Food vendors often adapt their products to the festival’s pink theme or draw inspiration from šaltibarščiai, a traditional Lithuanian cold beetroot soup.

For example, at the 2026 Pink Soup Fest, visitors could try pink cepelinai. Cepelinai are a traditional Lithuanian dish usually made from grated and boiled potatoes and are typically greyish in colour. For the festival, their appearance was changed to match the event’s visual theme and its association with pink beetroot soup.

== Images of the 2026 edition ==
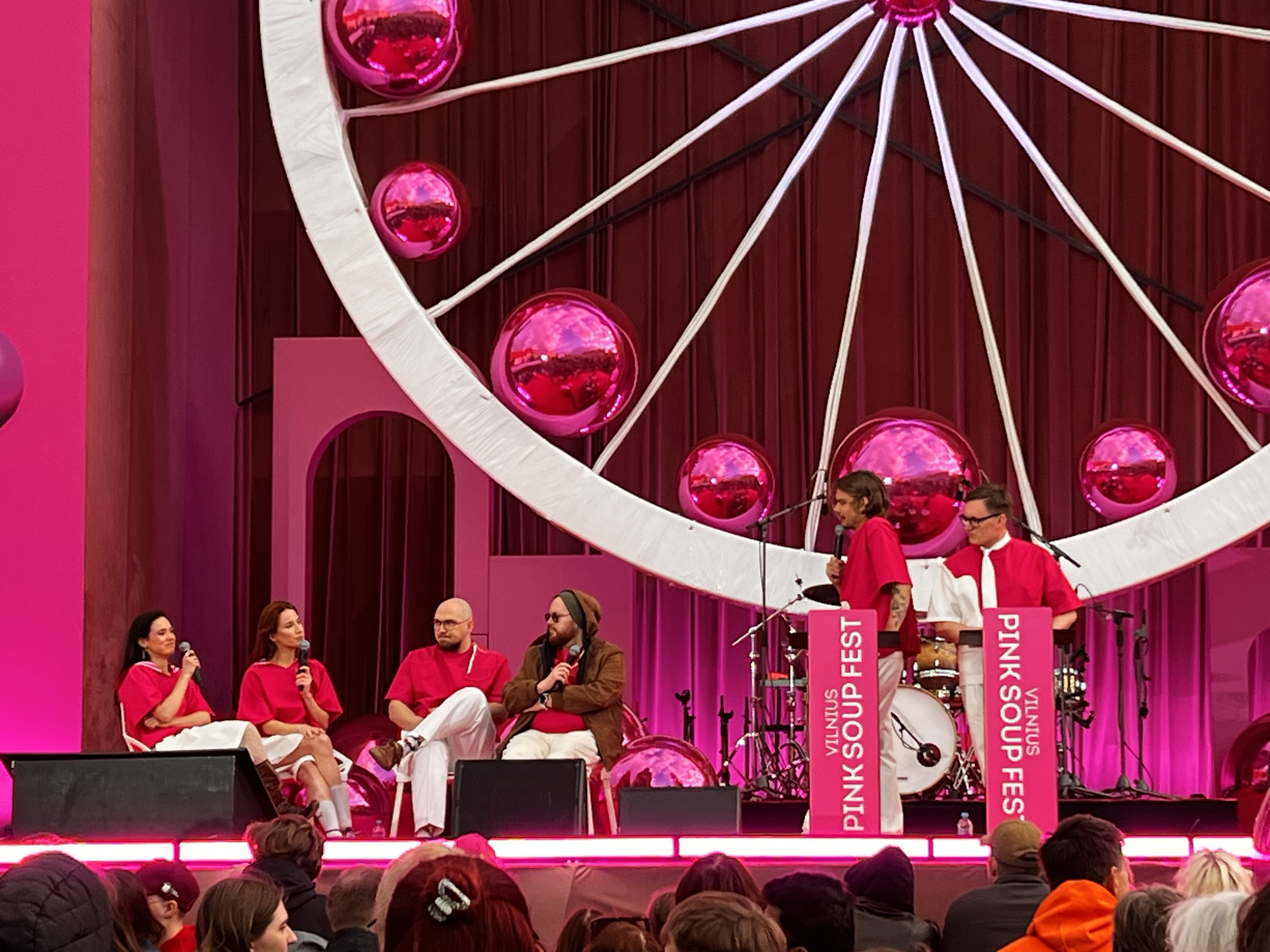
A comedy show on the stage on Townhall Square (Rotušės aikštė).

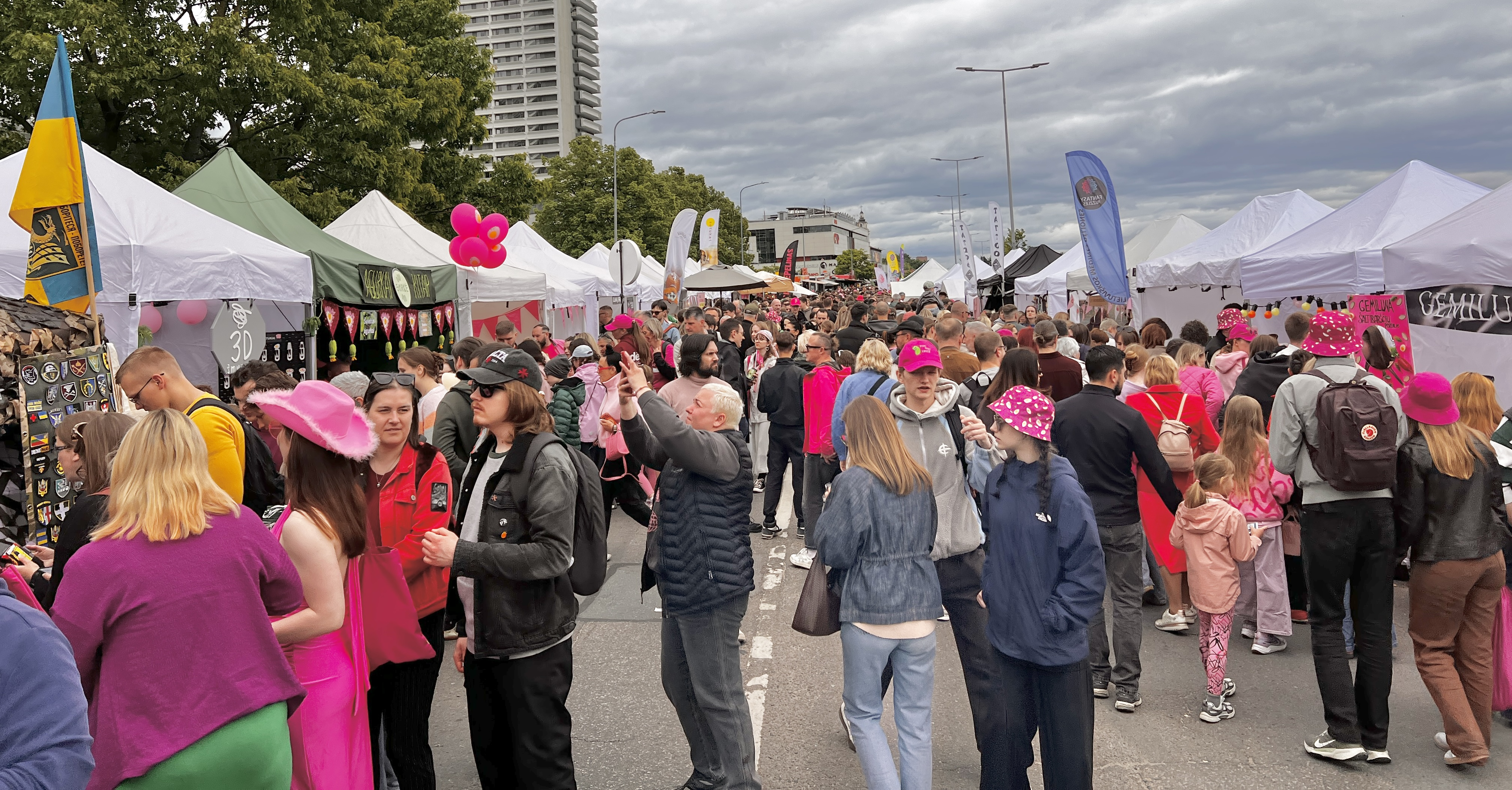
The food and crafts market.

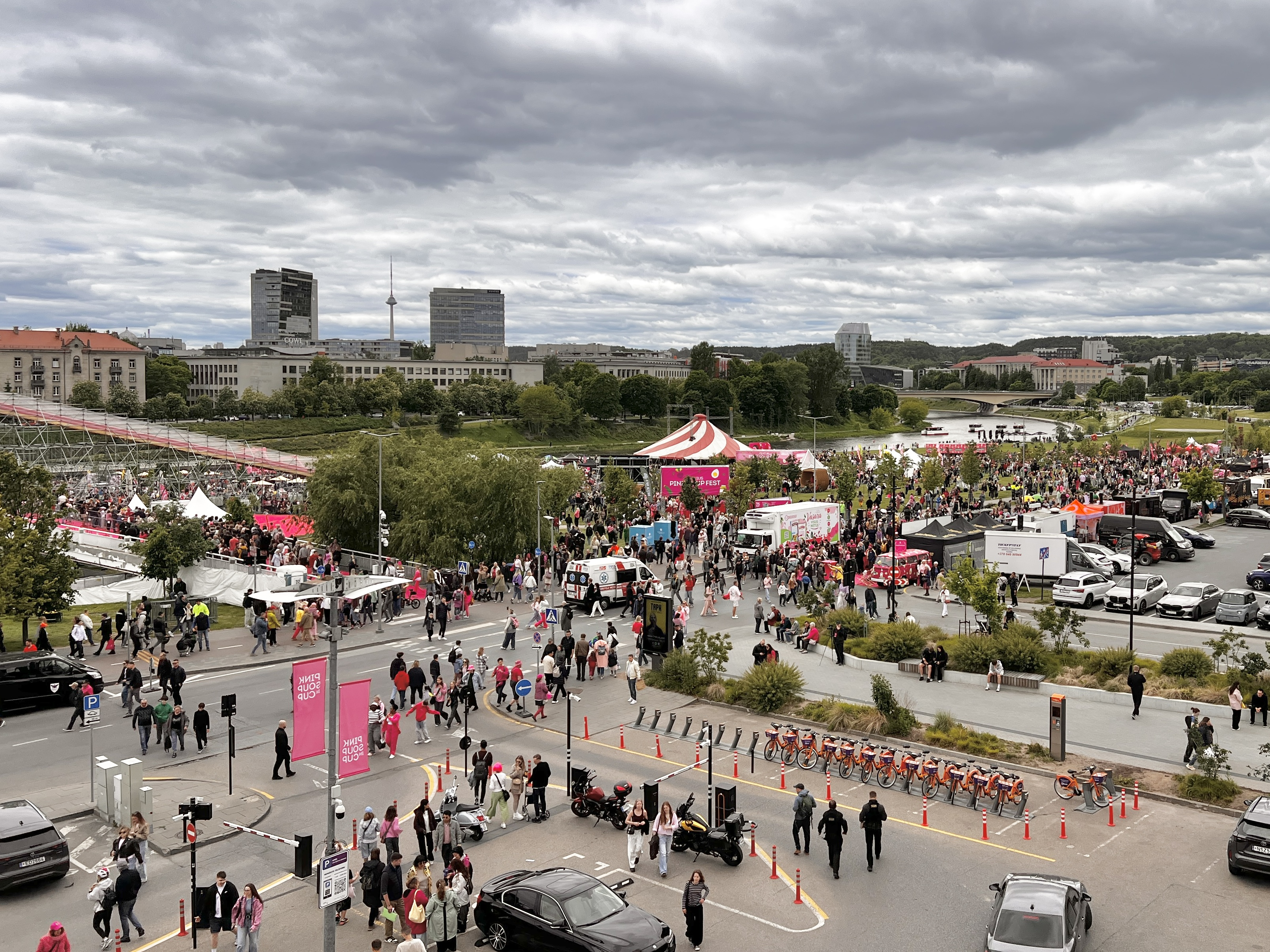
View of the festival ground near the Neris river.

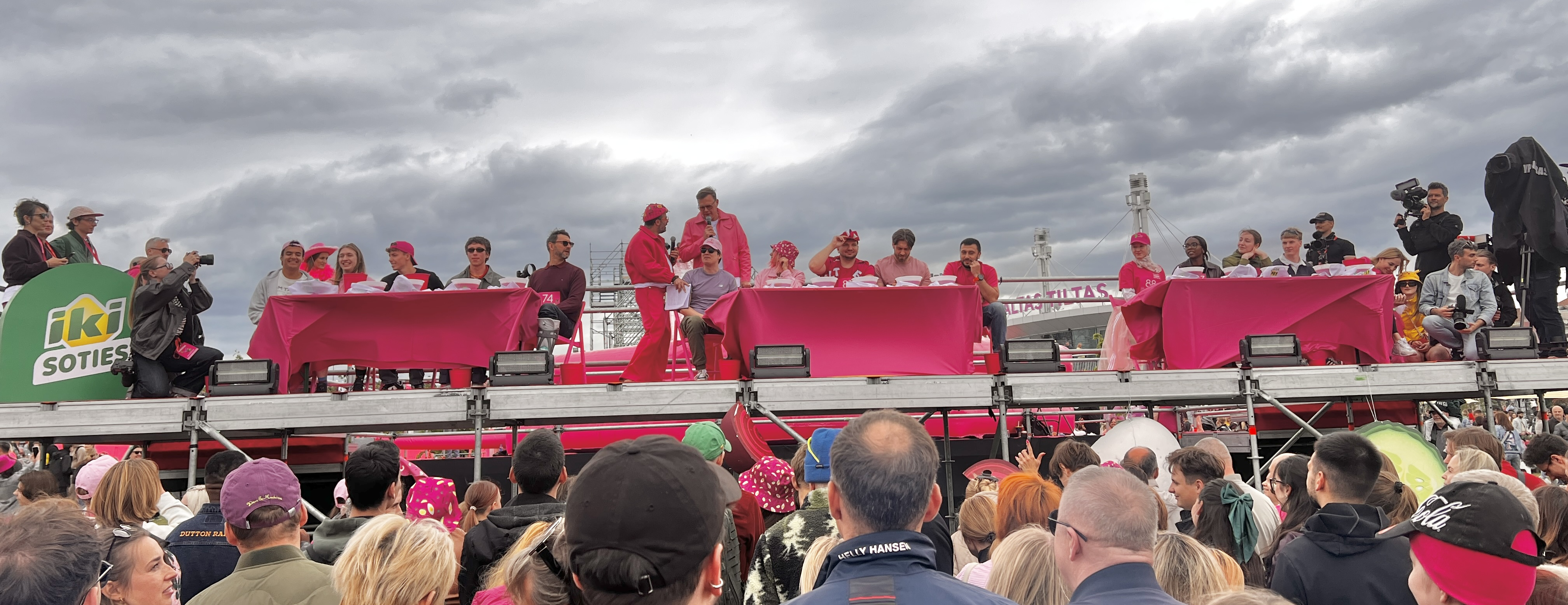
During the soup eating contest.

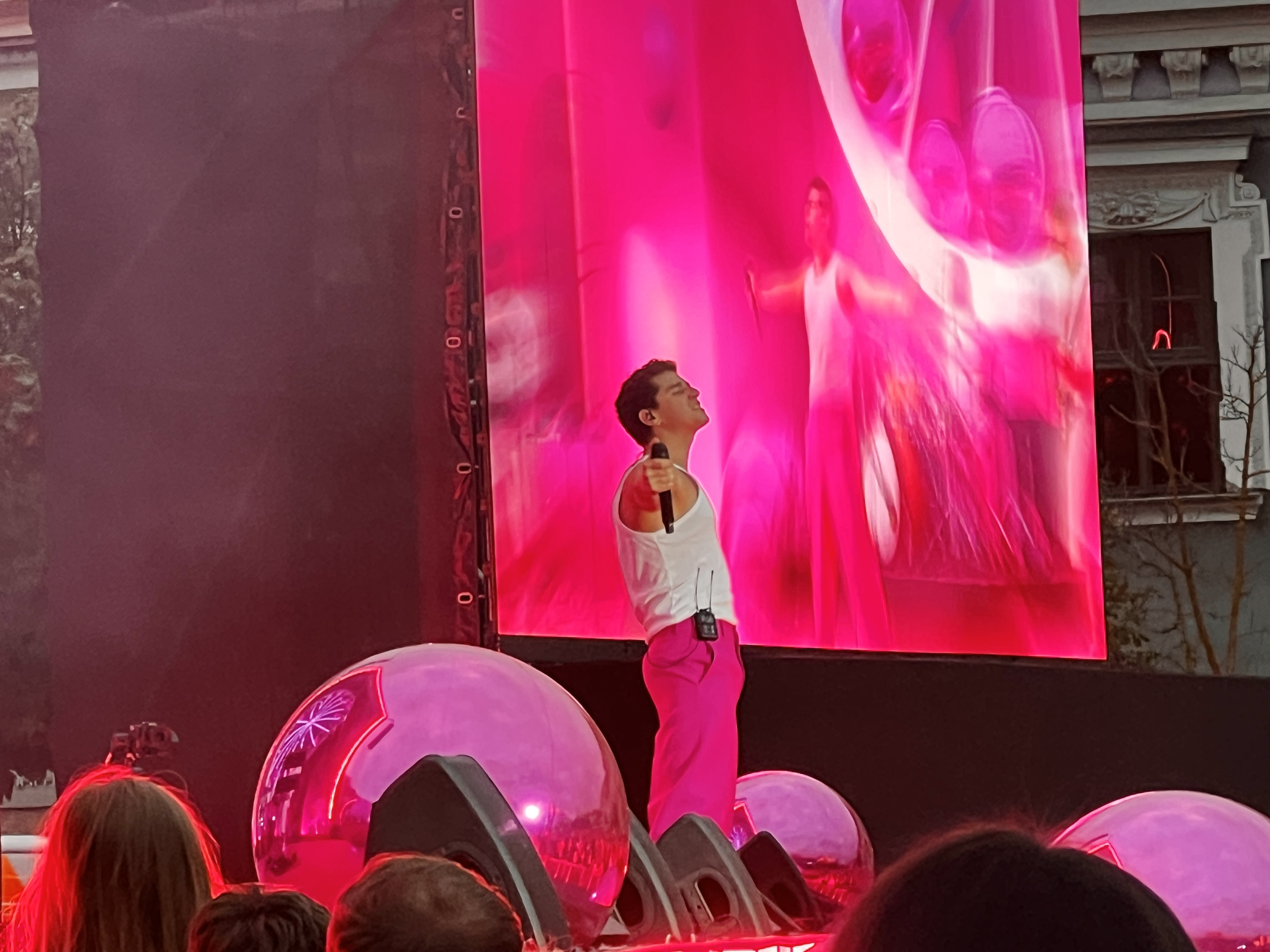
Donatas Montvydas during his concert.

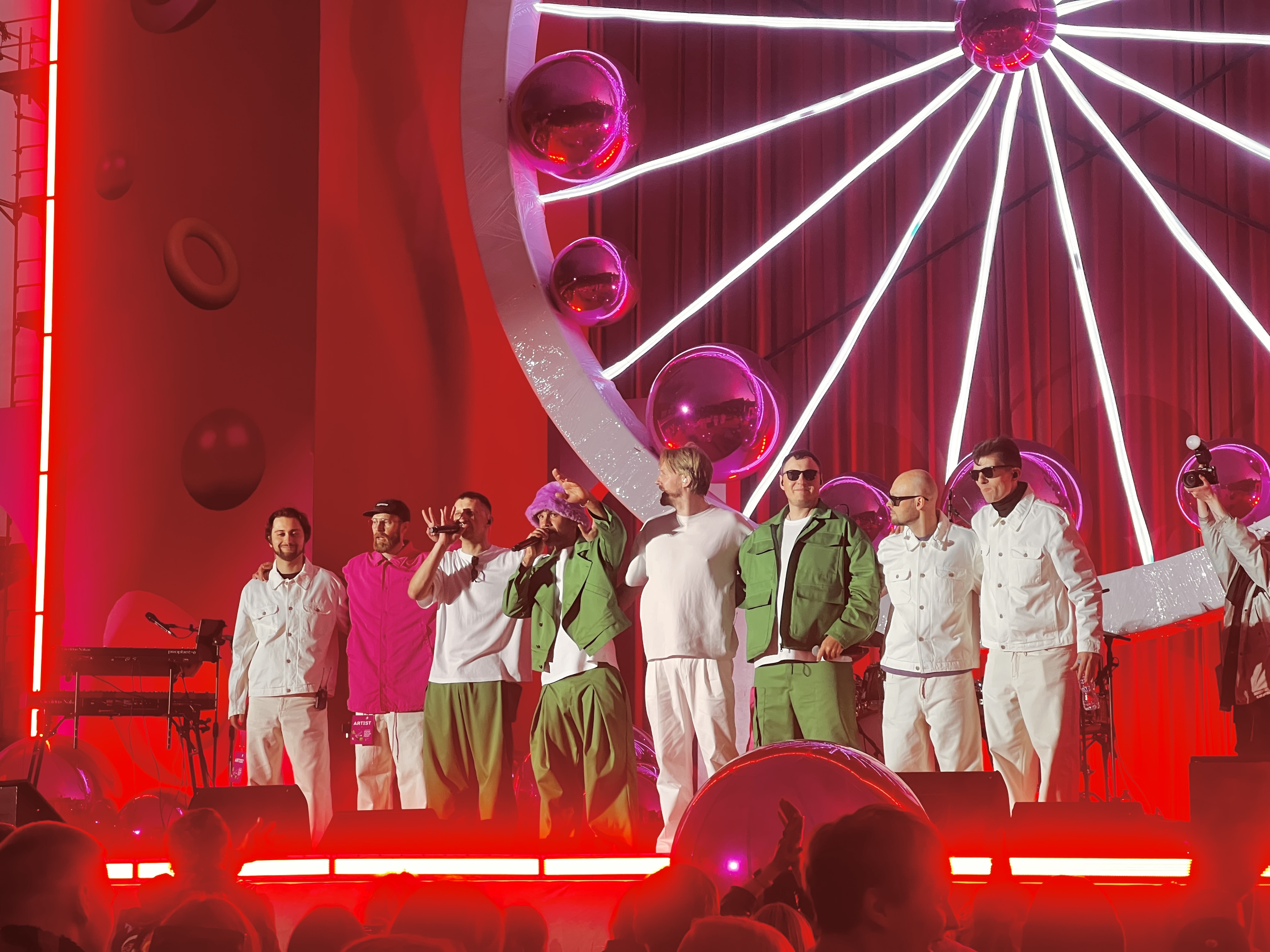
Despotin Fam at the end of their concert.
