= Portal (sculptures) =

Video conference sculptures

Logo of Portals, the organization creating the Portal series

The Portal is a series of sculpture attractions which videoconference between one another. Created by Lithuanian artist Benediktas Gylys, they are large, identical circular sculptures that are located in various public city spaces, connecting two cities together by displaying a livestream of each city along with a camera on top of the screen. Initially starting as a concept in 2016, the first two installations of the Portal series were unveiled in 2021 for the Vilnius–Lublin Portal. In 2024, the New York–Dublin Portal, the next two and most recent installations in the series, were unveiled.

== Description ==
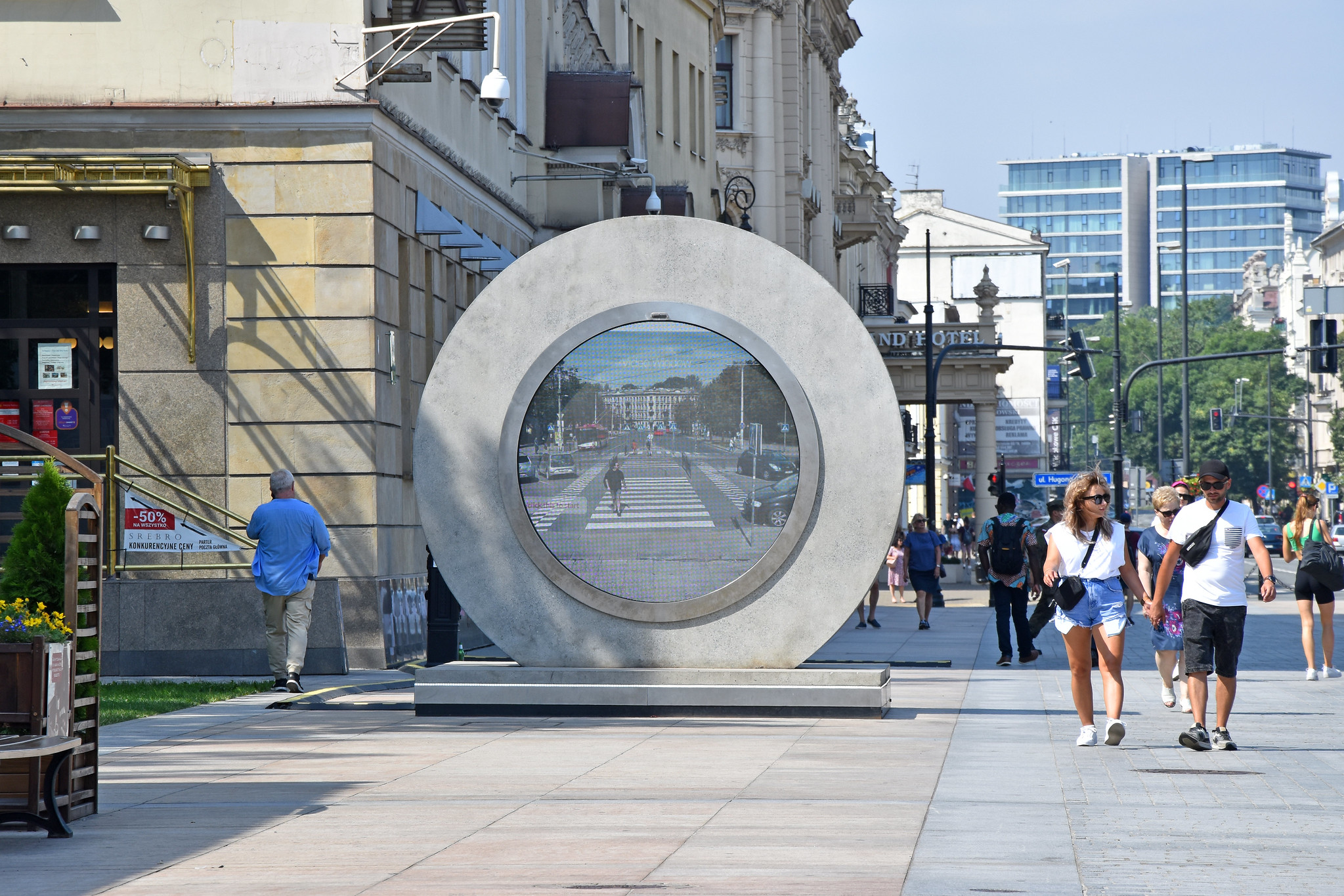
The Vilnius–Lublin Portal in Lublin

Each Portal is a large, circular sculpture featuring a screen and a camera. It connects with another Portal, both capturing and displaying a livestream of each other. It was designed by Vilnius Gediminas Technical University's engineering department as a reference to the wheel of time.

== History ==
A similar, earlier sculpture, the Telectroscope, linked New York and London in 2008. According to Portal creator Benediktas Gylys, he had the idea for his project in 2016 "after a mystical experience." Through his Benediktas Gylys Foundation, Gylys partnered with Vilnius Gediminas Technical University to develop the first two sculptures in the series, which were placed in Vilnius, Lithuania and Lublin, Poland on 26 May 2021.

On 8 May 2024, another two installations in the series were placed in New York City and Dublin, Ireland, to create the New York–Dublin Portal. The Dublin installation is located on O'Connell Street, while the New York City Portal was placed at the Flatiron South Public Plaza. A few days after the installation, the portals in Dublin and New York were shut down temporarily following instances of "inappropriate behavior".

On 22 October 2025, a fifth portal was placed in Ipswich in a ceremony attended by Gylys and local government leaders, including the Mayor of Ipswich. This location was chosen as the first in the United Kingdom. Despite initial controversy ahead of its release, it has been argued that the Ipswich Portal could bring greater footfall into the town centre.

On 13 January 2026, a sixth installation—the BGC Portal—was announced, set to be placed at the Bonifacio Global City district in Taguig, Metro Manila, Philippines, making it as Asia's first portal. The installation opened on 21 January, eight days after the announcement.

On March 28, 2026, the portal network expanded its presence to South America for the first time with the inauguration of a structure in Brazil. The portal was installed in the village of Barra Grande, Piauí, in the municipality of Cajueiro da Praia, on the coast of Piauí. The installation was established in the Reserva do Portal Public Park through an investment by the Government of the State of Piauí.

== Locations ==
Portal installations as of 2026
Photograph	City	Country	Opening date	Status
	Vilnius (Town Hall)	Lithuania	May 26, 2021	Active
	Lublin	Poland	May 26, 2021	Active
	Dublin	Republic of Ireland	May 8, 2024	Active
	New York City	United States	May 8, 2024	Offline
	Philadelphia	United States	October 22, 2024	Active
	Ipswich	United Kingdom	October 22, 2025	Active
	Taguig	Philippines	January 21, 2026	Active
	Cajueiro da Praia (Barra Grande)	Brazil	March 28, 2026	Active

== See also ==
- Telectroscope, a similar sculpture from 2008.
