= New York–Dublin Portal =

Video portal installation connecting two cities! shut down on 8/16/26 due to nudity

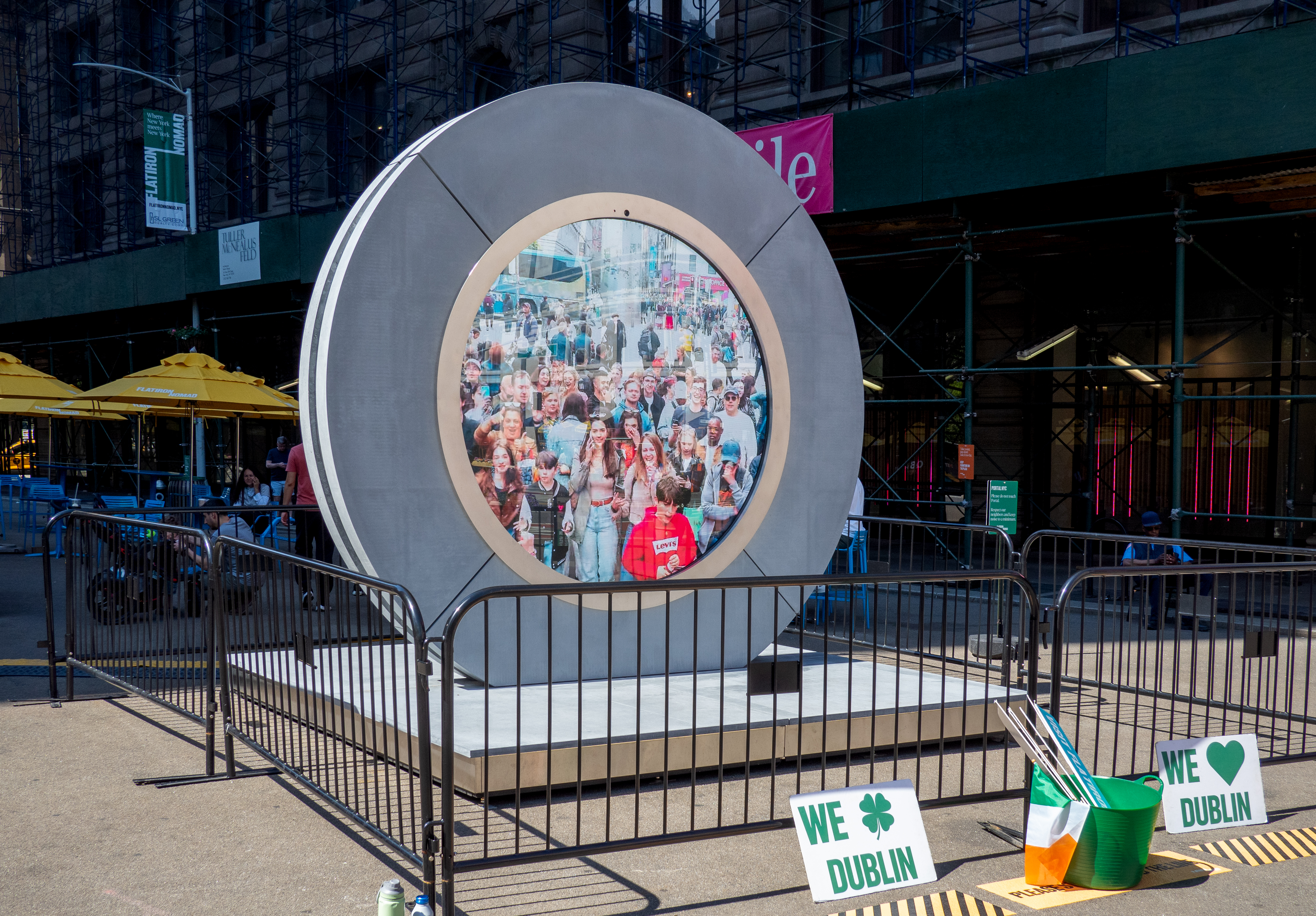
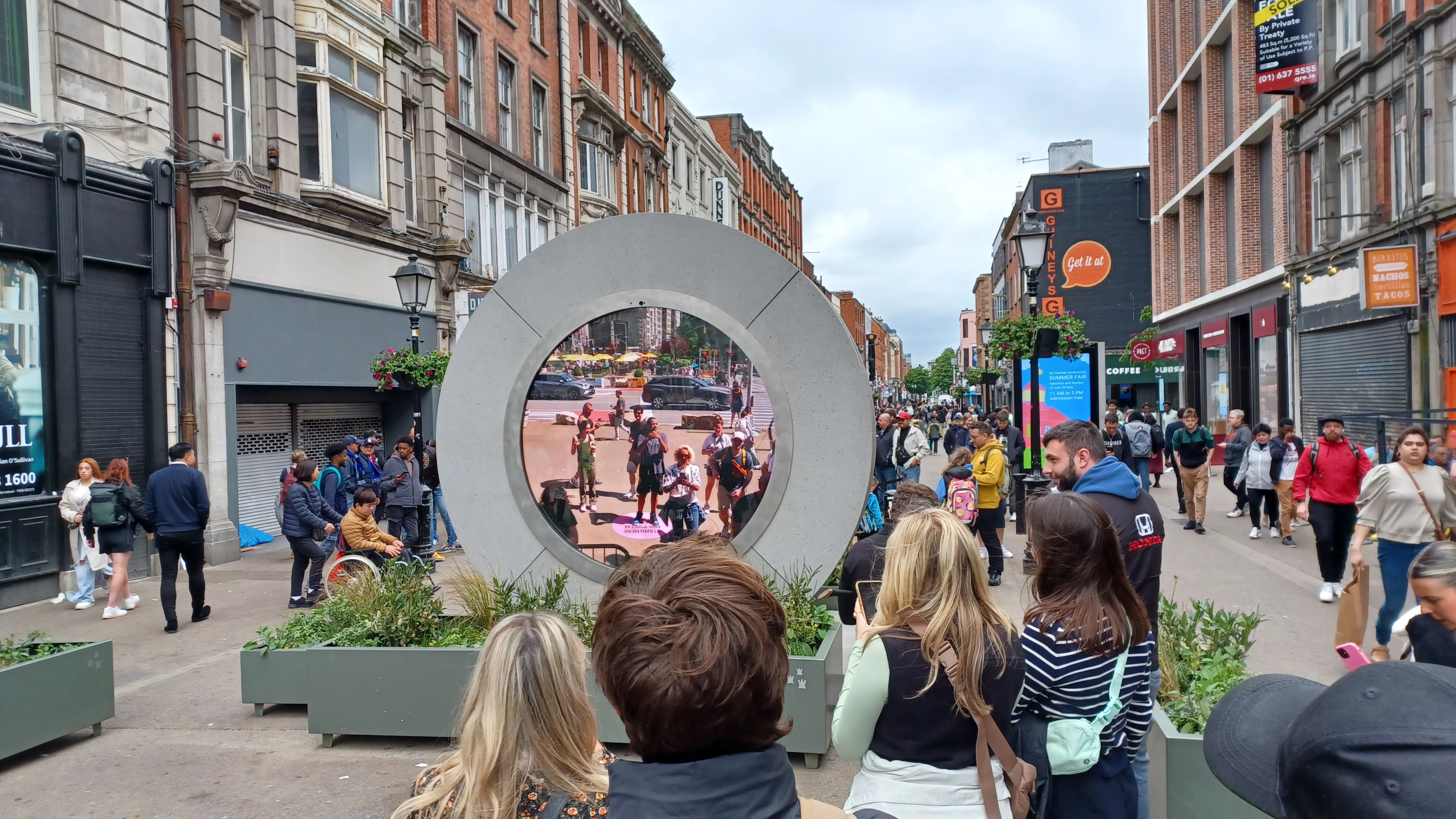
- The New York–Dublin Portal as seen in New York (top) and Dublin (bottom)
- Artist: Benediktas Gylys
- Year: 2024
- Location: Flatiron South Public Plaza, New York; O'Connell Street, Dublin; New York 40.7416059°N 73.9893016°W; Dublin 53.3499019°N 6.2597106°W
- Preceded by: Vilnius–Lublin Portal
- Website: Official website

The New York–Dublin Portal (also simply known as The Portal) is an interactive installation created by Lithuanian artist Benediktas Gylys to allow people in New York City and Dublin to interact with each other using two 24-hour live streaming video screens (without audio). The second series of installations in Gylys' Portal series, the New York–Dublin Portal has been compared to Paul St George's past art installation named the Telectroscope, which connected New York to London in 2008. The portal first opened on May 8, 2024 and closed on September 2, 2024 due to inappropriate behaviour such as profanity and nudity. The portal was moved to Philadelphia in October 2024.

== History ==
The Portal sculpture was made by Benediktas Gylys. The first of these to be unveiled was the portal linking Vilnius, Lithuania to Lublin, Poland on May 26, 2021. Following its success, it was confirmed in March 2024 that by spring, Dublin and New York would be the next cities to receive them.

On Wednesday, May 8, 2024, the portals were introduced in their respective cities, with the New York screen being installed on the Flatiron South Public Plaza at 23rd Street, Fifth Avenue and Broadway next to the Flatiron Building, while the Dublin screen was positioned on O'Connell Street. In a press release on the same day, Gylys said they would only remain in place until autumn. To celebrate the launch, people in both cities held up signs to greet each other, with people on the New York side performing a dance routine.

On June 12, 2024, a collaboration of the Museum of Mathematics in Manhattan and Maths Week Ireland saw 10-year-old schoolchildren in both New York City and Dublin use the portal to challenge each other to solve several puzzles.

In August 2024, it was announced that the New York–Dublin Portal would be deactivated. The portal was shut down on September 2, 2024 and moved to Philadelphia where it has been in operation since October 2024.

=== Abuse of the portal ===
On Monday, May 13, 2024, the connecting screens were turned off temporarily after "inappropriate behavior" by participants. Some on the Dublin side displayed pornography and imagery of the September 11 attacks, projected profanities from their phone screens, and performed indecent exposure. On the New York side, an OnlyFans model exposed her breasts to those in Dublin. A Dublin City Council spokesperson said the authority had seen a "very small minority" behaving unsuitably, and technical solutions to address it were being implemented. The Council ruled out the possibility of blurring the video feed.

On Sunday, May 19, the New York and Dublin Portals were placed back online with updated digital technology to blur the screen if a person entered a visual field too close to the portal. This prevented several attempts by individuals to project images through the portal's camera system.

== Reception ==
Shortly after the New York–Dublin Portal was reactivated in May 2024, the novelist Megan Nolan wrote for The Guardian: "There was something simian about the Portal, not only in that it felt zoo-like being regarded by the other side as they waited to be entertained, but also in the way that people behave when language is out of bounds."

== See also ==
- Irish Americans
- Irish Americans in New York City
- Americans in Ireland
- Ireland–United States relations
- Telectroscope
- Vilnius–Lublin Portal
