= Vilnius–Lublin Portal =

2021 public attraction

Portal in Vilnius

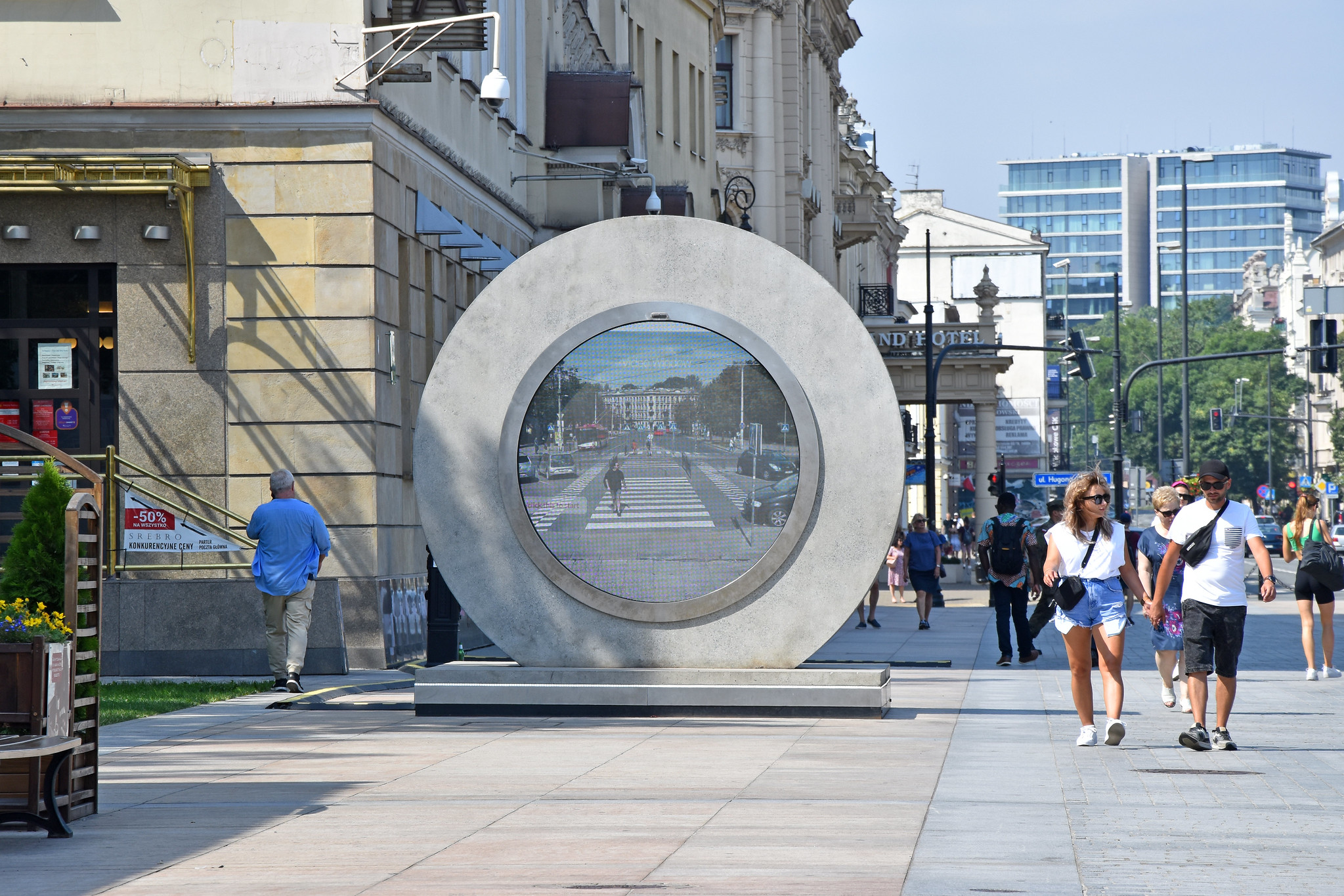
Portal in Lublin in August 2022

The Vilnius–Lublin Portal is a public attraction that videoconferences between separate outdoor structures in Vilnius, Lithuania, and Lublin, Poland.

== Description ==
The portal connects Vilnius, Lithuania, and Lublin, Poland, through large, public structures that use videoconference technology, with a camera showing one location on the screen of the other.

== Development ==
A similar earlier work, the Telectroscope, was in place between New York and London in 2008. Benediktas Gylys wanted his similar work to unify and develop empathy in onlookers. The project is a joint venture between the Benediktas Gylys Foundation, the Cities of Vilnius and Lublin, and the latter's Center for Intercultural Creative Initiatives. The portal took five years to develop into its final form. Engineers from Vilnius Gediminas Technical University's Creativity and Innovation Center designed the portal. It was designed as a circle to recall themes of time and from science fiction. Each portal weighs 11 tons.

The project totaled €111,000 in costs. The project had won a competition to spur tourism in Vilnius, the Lithuanian capital city.

In the following years, the Lublin–Vilnius Portal gained international recognition as an example of contemporary public art. At the end of 2023, the project began to expand, and in spring 2024 Dublin and New York joined the network, creating a global system of interconnected cities.

Since 26 August 2024, the portals have operated in a rotational system, changing the transmission image every three minutes. The Lublin–Vilnius connection functions continuously, while the transmissions from Dublin and New York were temporary. After the New York portal closed in September 2024 for organizational reasons, it was briefly replaced by a live image of Earth from the International Space Station (ISS), and from October 2024 by a transmission from Philadelphia.

In April 2025, the Vilnius portal was relocated to the Old Town opposite the Town Hall, reinforcing the symbolic character of the installation. In October 2025, Ipswich in the United Kingdom joined the network as the fifth city; with an odd number of locations, the rotation still includes the view of Earth from space. In January 2026, Manila, the capital of the Philippines, joined the portal network. On 28 March 2026, Barra Grande, a small coastal town in Brazil, also became part of the network.

== Reception ==
A writer for The Verge likened the portal to creations from the Stargate media universe.

== See also ==
- Telectroscope, a similar sculpture in 2008
- Portal (sculptures)
- New York–Dublin Portal
