= BGC Portal =

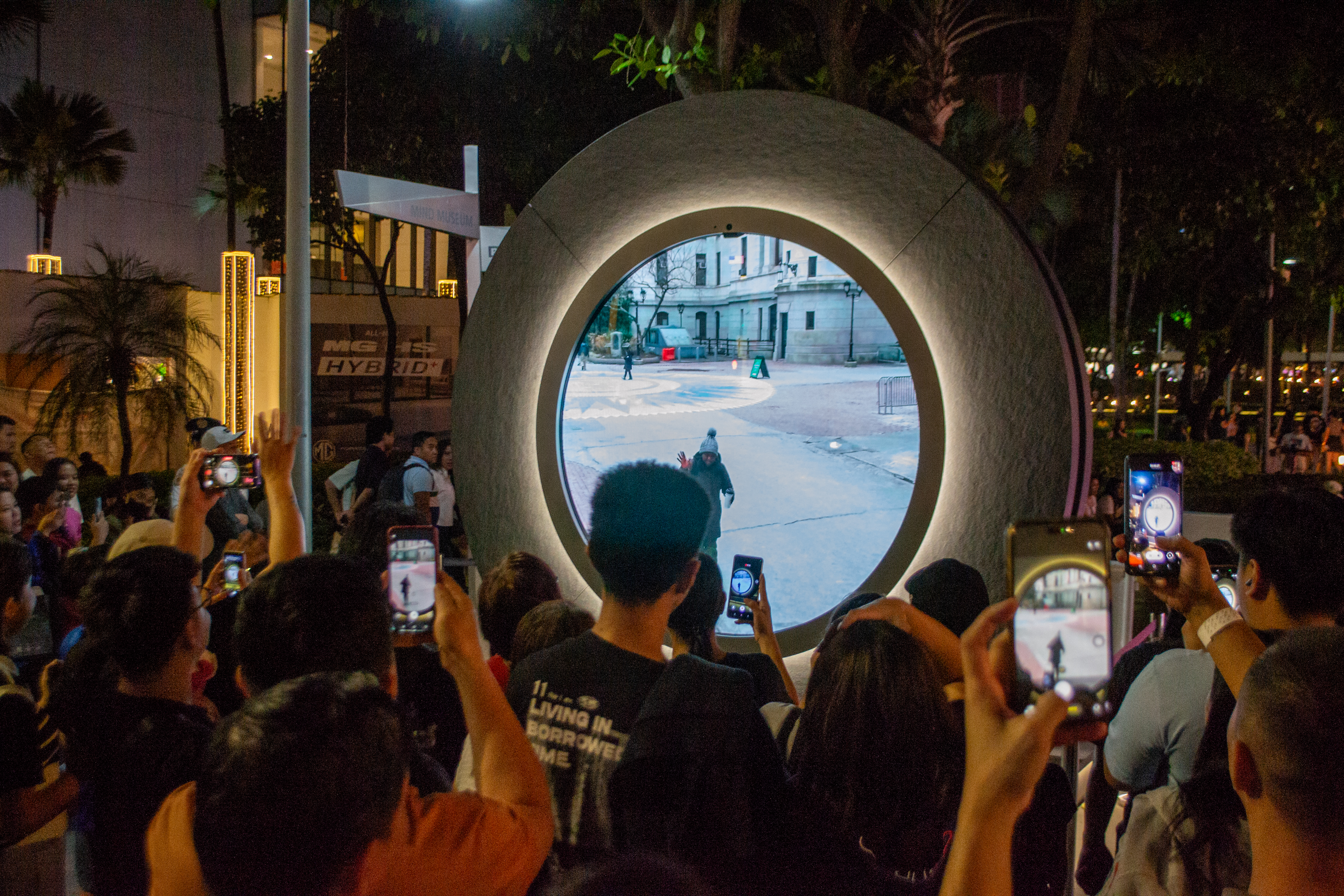
- The BGC Portal surrounded with crowds at night
- Artist: Benediktas Gylys
- Completion date: 21 January 2026
- Location: 5th Avenue, Bonifacio High Street, Bonifacio Global City, Fort Bonifacio, Taguig

The BGC Portal is an interactive installation that allows people in Bonifacio Global City (BGC), Taguig, Metro Manila, Philippines, to interact with the cities of Dublin, Ipswich, Lublin, Philadelphia, and Vilnius using two 24-hour live streaming video screens without audio. It is the first Portal sculpture in Asia and the sixth worldwide.

== History ==
The Portal installations were created by Lithuanian artist Benediktas Gylys. The BGC Portal, which opened on January 21, 2026, is the first Portal installation in Asia and the sixth worldwide. The Ipswich Portal is the first to connect to BGC Portal upon the opening of the latter.
