= George R. Carey =

American inventor

George R. Carey (1851–1906) was an American inventor. He was among the first to propose the telectroscope using the photoelectric properties of selenium as a means for transmitting images—a precursor to modern television.

George R. Carey was a professional surveyor employed by the City of Boston.

In 1873, Willoughby Smith had discovered that the amount of electric current that selenium conducted depended on the amount of light striking it. Carey learned of this discovery and used it to devise a crude system for transmitting images as an early attempt at television.

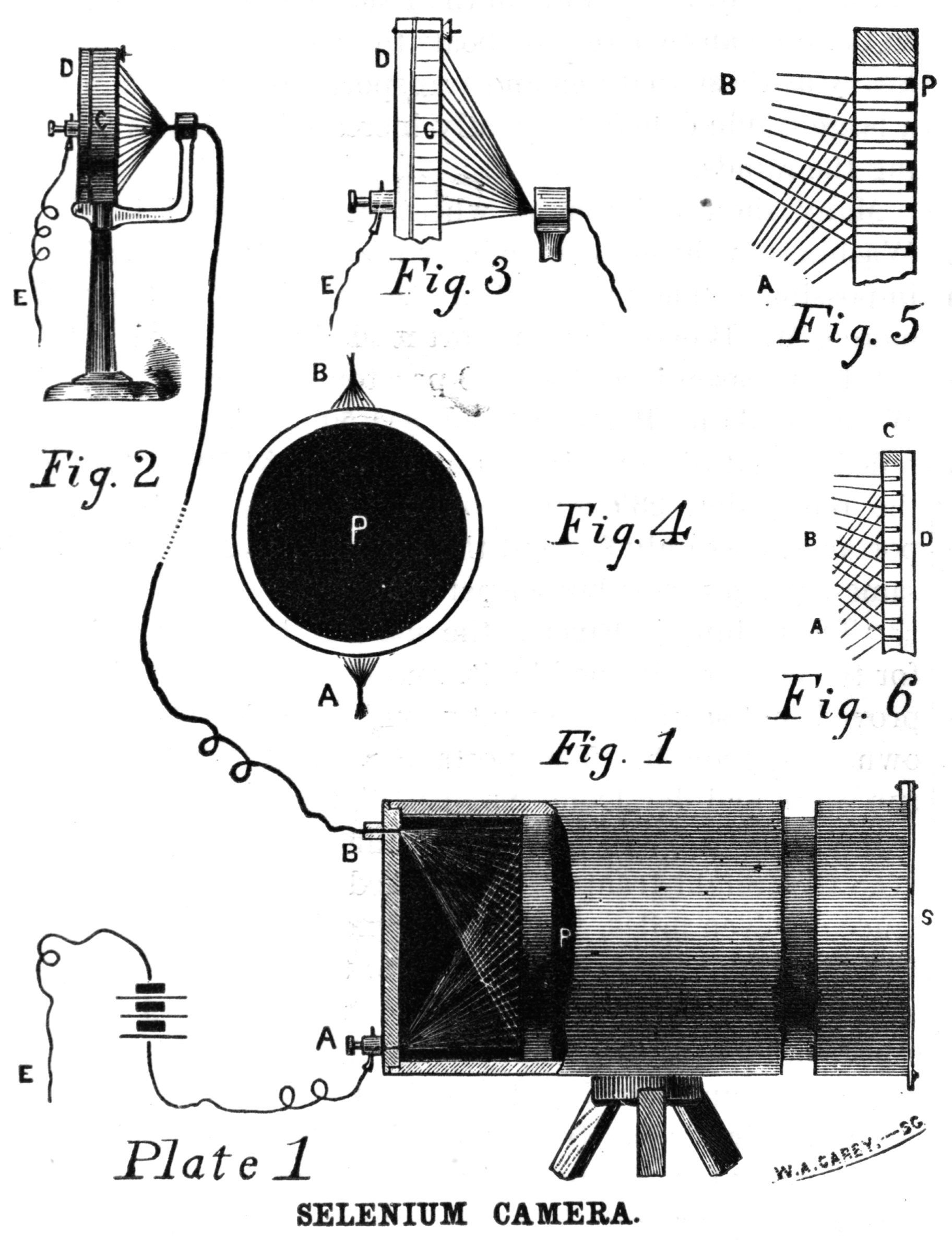
George Carey's selenium camera, as illustrated in the Scientific American article Seeing by Electricity, June 5, 1880

In the May 17, 1878, issue of Scientific American, the editors alluded to their earlier article about the 'telectroscope invented by M. Senlecq of Ardres.' This was followed by the news that they had before them 'some very ingenious and curious applications of selenium, in which its peculiar property of changing its electrical conductivity when exposed to light varying in intensity is utilized. The several devices are the invention of Mr. George R. Carey, of Boston, Mass.' A more detailed article was published in the June 5, 1880 Scientific American.

The Scientific American article described two different inventions.

The first used an array of selenium photocells and wires to transmit an image to an array of light, which were then used to expose a piece of photographic paper. The photograph could then be developed to create a single image.

The second invention used a large array of photocells and wires to transmit the signal to a visual display made of many individual lights. Although this approach should work in theory, each individual pixel requires its own photocell and wired circuit, making this system cumbersome and expensive for producing even a modest size image.

Carey was sometimes credited with making his invention as early as in 1875. However, he himself wrote that he only had an idea for his invention a year later. Neither does it seem probable that his invention was the inspiration for the supposedly fake "Electroscope" described in the March 29, 1877, issue of the New York Sun.
