= Constantin Senlecq =

French scientist and inventor

Constantin Senlecq (Fauquembergues, 1842 – Ardres, 1934) was a French scientist and inventor who is credited with the invention of telectroscope. He worked independently of the American inventor George R. Carey, who came up with a similar idea at approximately the same time ( 1877–1880). Telectroscope was the first prototype television. It used the photoconductive properties of selenium to transmit an image.

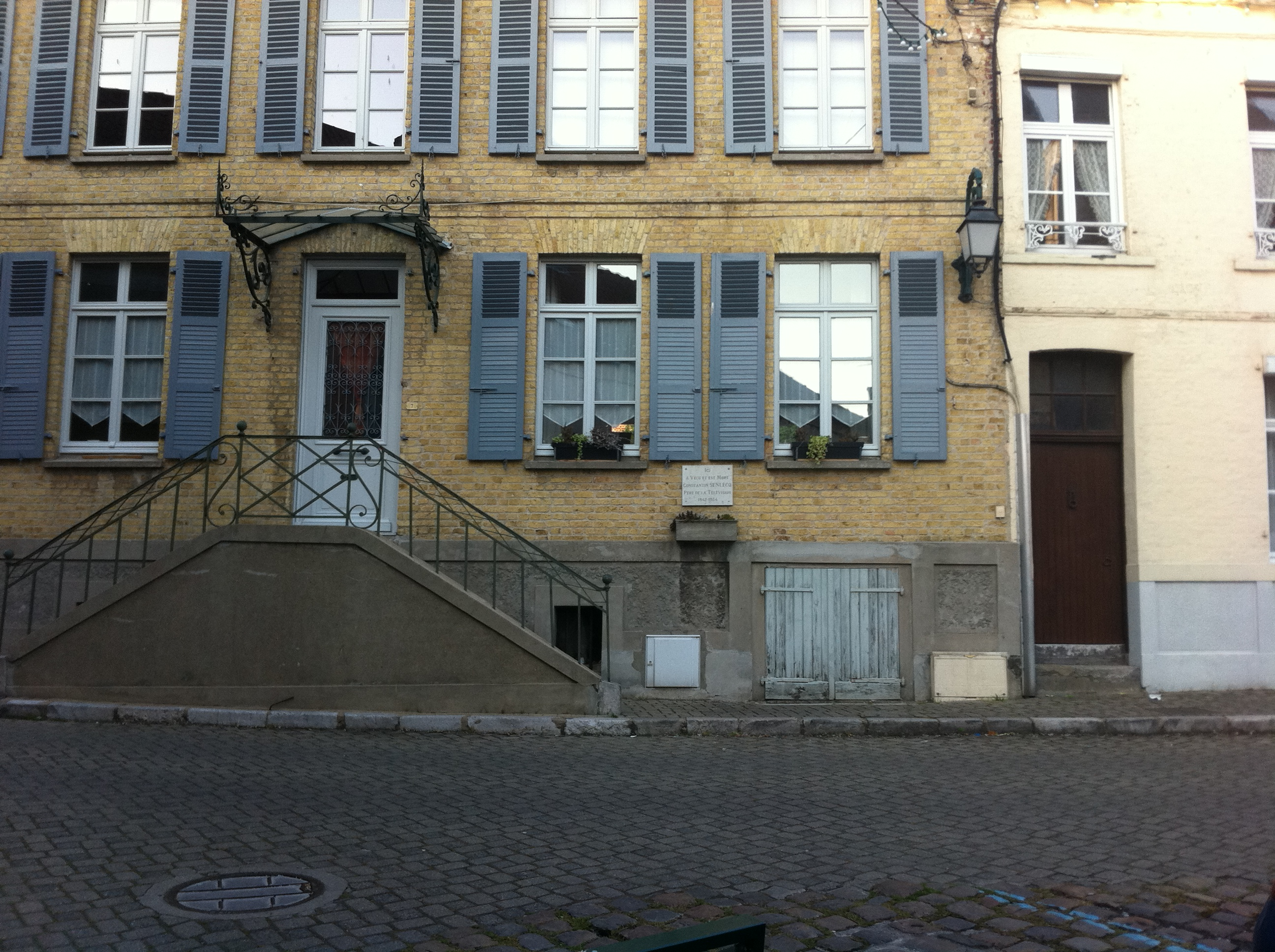
House where Constantin Senlecq lived and died - Ardres, France.

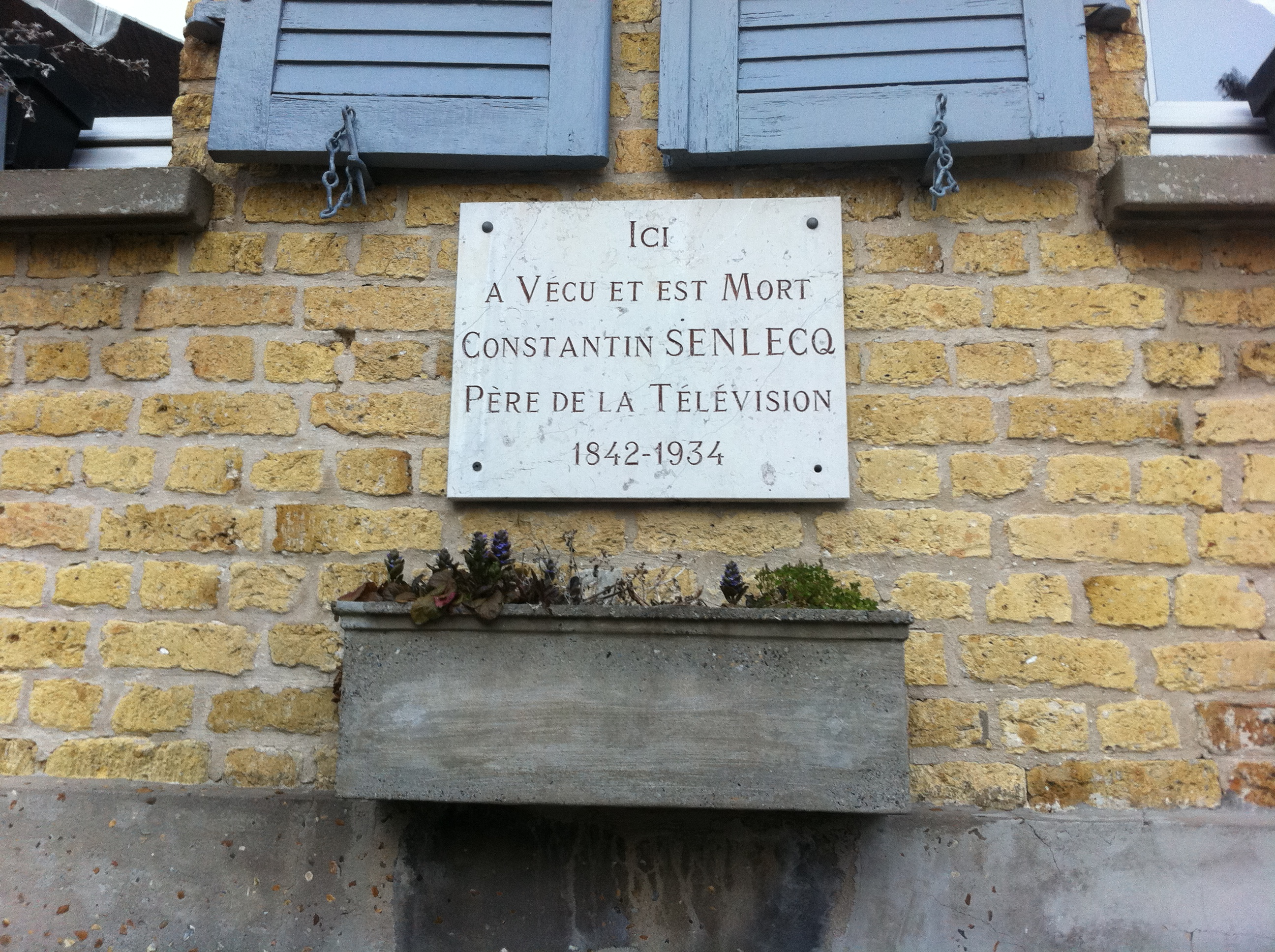
House of Constantin Senlecq - Commemorative tablet.
