= Adriano de Paiva =

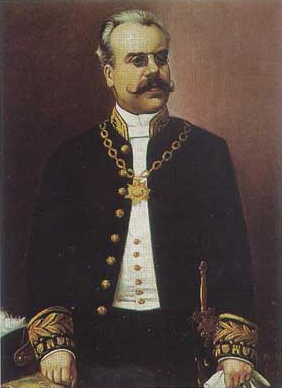
Late. Adriano de Paiva Brandāo picture

Adriano de Paiva (1847–1907) was a Portuguese scientist who was one of the pioneers of telectroscope. He worked at the Politechnical Academy of Porto and conducted research into selenium as a material to transmit images.

His work followed the discovery of photoconductivity in selenium by Willoughby Smith in 1873. In the 19th century he suggested the use of a chemical that would enable images to be transmitted at a considerable range.
