= Gabriela Puzynina =

Polish writer (1815 – 1869)

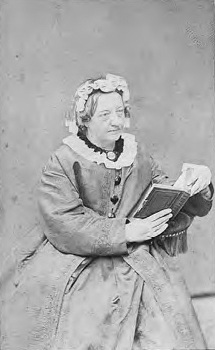

Gabriela Puzynina (1815 – 1869) was a Polish poet, playwright and diarist.

She was born on September 24 1815, the third daughter of Adam Günther and Aleksandra Tyzenhaus. She married Tadeusz Puzyna in 1851.

Gabriela began writing poetry in childhood and published her first volume in 1843. Six of her plays were successfully staged, including Philosophe’s Daughter. Her house and library in Vilnius were a hub for the authors of the day. Her memoir and letters relate the social life of Polish high society and the reactions within her circle to uprisings against Russia.
