= Paul St George =

British artist

Paul St George is a London based multimedia artist and sculptor, best known for The Telectroscope, an art installation visually linking London and New York.

St George's other projects have included Minumentals, miniatures of famous large-scale sculptures such as The Angel of the North, for the Locus + arts organization, and Revelation, a multimedia installation at Gunpowder Park in Waltham Abbey, Essex. He was one of the contributing artists to and curator of Sequences, an exhibition of contemporary art and chronophotography which toured six cities in the UK in 2004/2005. He was also the editor of Sequences: Contemporary Chronophotography and Experimental Digital Art.

== Life and works ==
Paul St George's father was an acrobatic tap dancer, his mother a costume designer. They were midway through a world tour of Kiss Me Kate when Paul was born – he started life in Norway, was weaned in Sweden, toddled in Finland but went to school in Bristol, England.

St George studied at Bath Academy of Art in Corsham, Wiltshire. The college was situated right next to Lacock Abbey where Fox Talbot invented photography. Paul's fascination with the relationships between images and different realities started there.

=== Notable works ===
St George's practice as an artist has always been concerned with questioning the relationship between the viewer and what is being viewed. His work is often associated with different realities, spectacle and viewer participation.

The Telectroscope – A steampunk inspired public art project in New York and London linking the two cities in real time.

Supermoment – A project making use of LEDs in a dark room in order to highlight the technology hidden in everyday life, drawing attention to what is often forgotten.

Carpet Castle – A playful project substituting carpet for sand.

Minumental sculpture – Recreating monumental contemporary sculptures on a miniature scale.

Chronocyclography – Photographs made from a trace of a person's movements to reveal the hidden dance and drawing from their actions.

Chronopan – imagery that contain both duration (chrono) and space (pan). Duration is enfolded into one image for example showing the change of light over a 10-hour exposure.

Trackorama – a print made from a camera that “tracks” along a line that can travel from one scene to another. This long tracking shot is laid out as a print on a wall.

== Notes and references ==
- Julian Stallabrass, Pauline van Mourik Broekman, Niru Ratnam (eds.), (2000) Locus Solus: Site, Identity, Technology in Contemporary Art, Black Dog Publishing. ISBN 1-901033-61-9
- Paul St George (ed.), (2008) Sequences: Contemporary Chronophotography and Experimental Digital Art, Wallflower Press ISBN 978-1-905674-76-3
