= Telectroscope =

Model of a videophone system

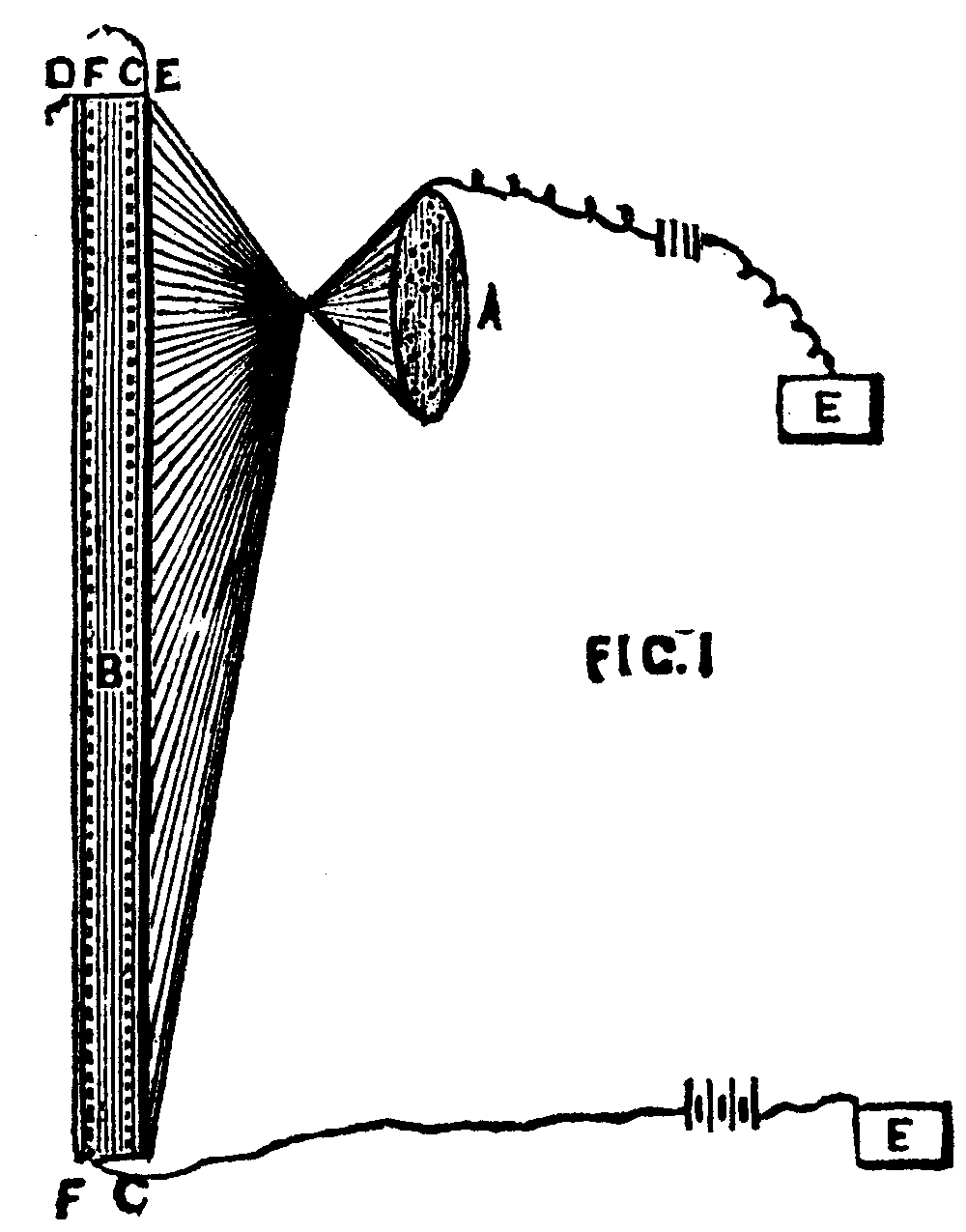
Telectroscope technical illustration in Scientific American Supplement No. 275, April 9, 1881

The telectroscope or electroscope was the first conceptual model of a television or videophone system. The term was used in the 19th century to describe science-based systems of distant seeing.

The name and its concept came into being not long after the telephone was patented in 1876, and its original concept evolved from that of remote facsimile reproductions onto paper, into the live viewing of remote images.

== Moigno and Figuier's imaginary telectroscope ==
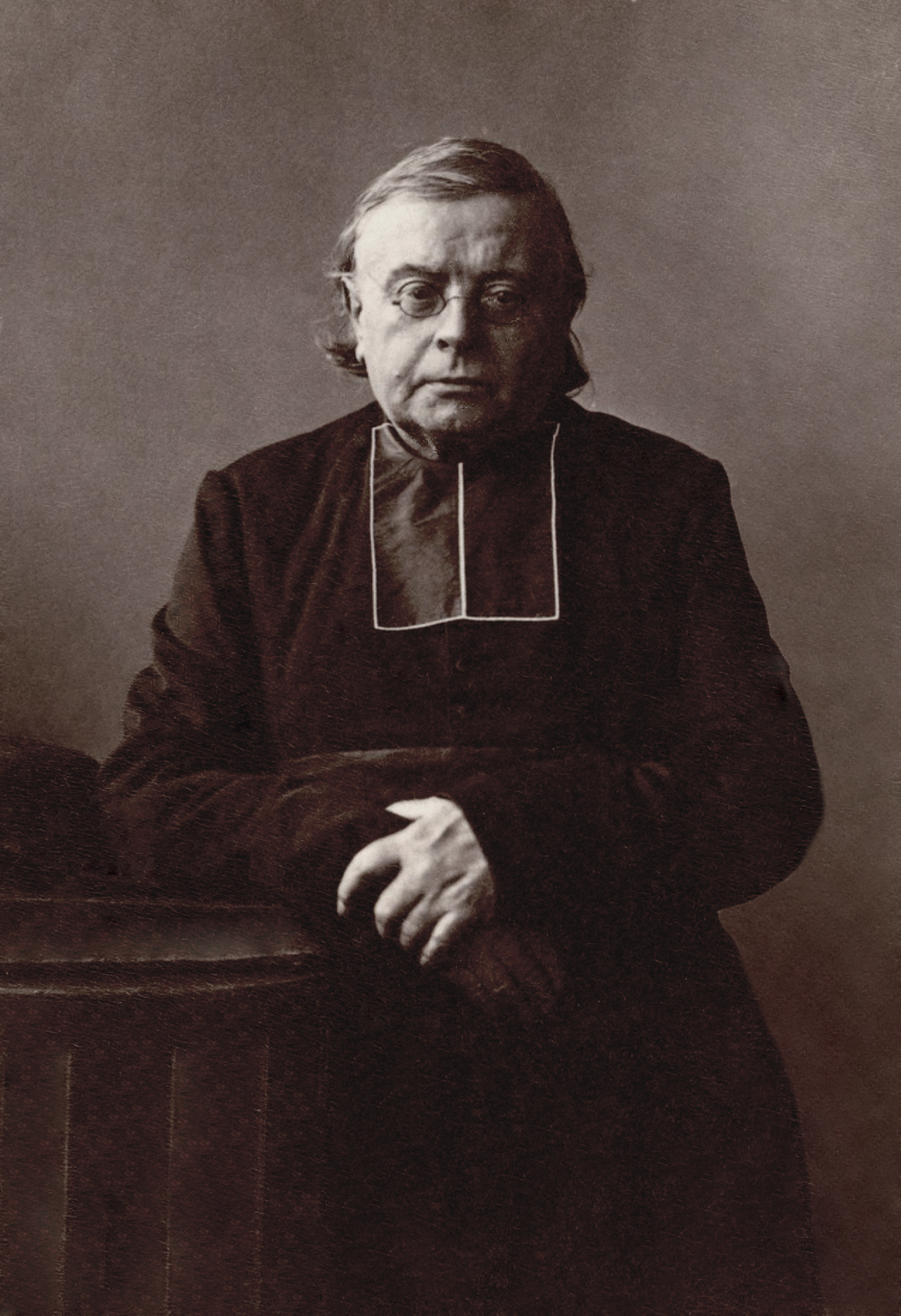
Abbé Moigno

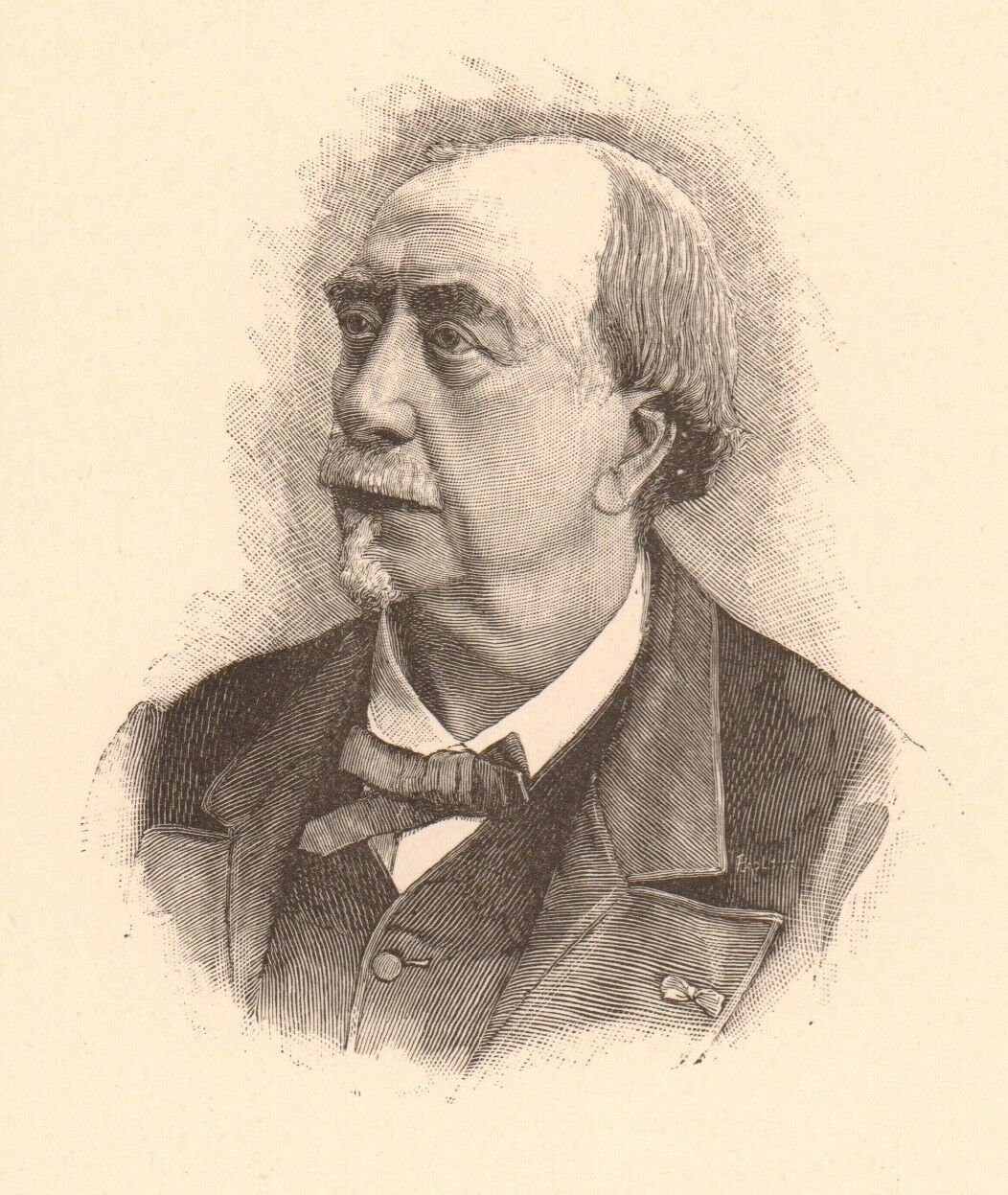
Louis Figuier

The term "telectroscope" (French: télectroscope) was used by the French abbot, mathematician and publisher Moigno in 1877 and by the French writer and publisher Louis Figuier in 1878 to popularize an invention wrongly interpreted as real and incorrectly ascribed to Alexander Graham Bell.

Both cite the press of Boston as their source, but they might have been misled by the article "The Electroscope" published in The Sun of 30 March 1877. Written under the pseudonym "Electrician", the New York Sun article claimed that "an eminent scientist", whose name had to be withheld, had invented a device whereby objects or people anywhere in the world "could be seen anywhere by anybody". According to the article, the device would allow merchants to transmit pictures of their wares to their customers, the contents of museum collections would be made available to scholars in distant cities, and (combined with the telephone) operas and plays could be broadcast into people's homes.

In reality, the imagined "telectroscopes" described in the articles had nothing to do with the device being developed by Dr. Bell and his assistant Charles Sumner Tainter which was christened with the ambiguous name photophone. The photophone was actually a wireless optical telephone that conveyed audio conversations on modulated lightbeams, the precursor for today's fiber-optic communications. Bell and Tainter would receive several patents in 1880 and 1881 for their then cutting-edge invention (master U.S. patent 235,199), which used the same selenium materials in its receivers that created the initial excitement surrounding the telectroscope's proposals.

== Further developments ==
Headline from the New York Times article on Szczepanik's telectroscope (April 3, 1898)

Nevertheless, the word "telectroscope" was widely accepted. It was used to describe the work of nineteenth century inventors and scientists such as Constantin Senlecq, George R. Carey, Adriano de Paiva, and Jan Szczepanik, who with Ludwig Kleiberg obtained a British patent (patent nr. 5031) for his device in 1897. Szczepanik's telectroscope, although never actually exhibited and, as some claim, likely never existed, was covered in the New York Times on April 3, 1898, where it was described as "a scheme for the transmission of colored rays". and it was further developed and presented on the exhibition in Paris in 1900. Szczepanik's experiments fascinated Mark Twain, who wrote a fictional account of his work in his short story From The Times of 1904. Both the imagined "telectroscope" of 1877 and Mark Twain's fictional device (called a telectrophonoscope) had an important effect on the public. They also provided feedback to the researchers.

Neither the fictional nor the real nineteenth-century prototype telectroscopes were real television systems. "Telectroscope" was eventually replaced by the term "television", most probably coined by Constantin Perskyi in 1900.

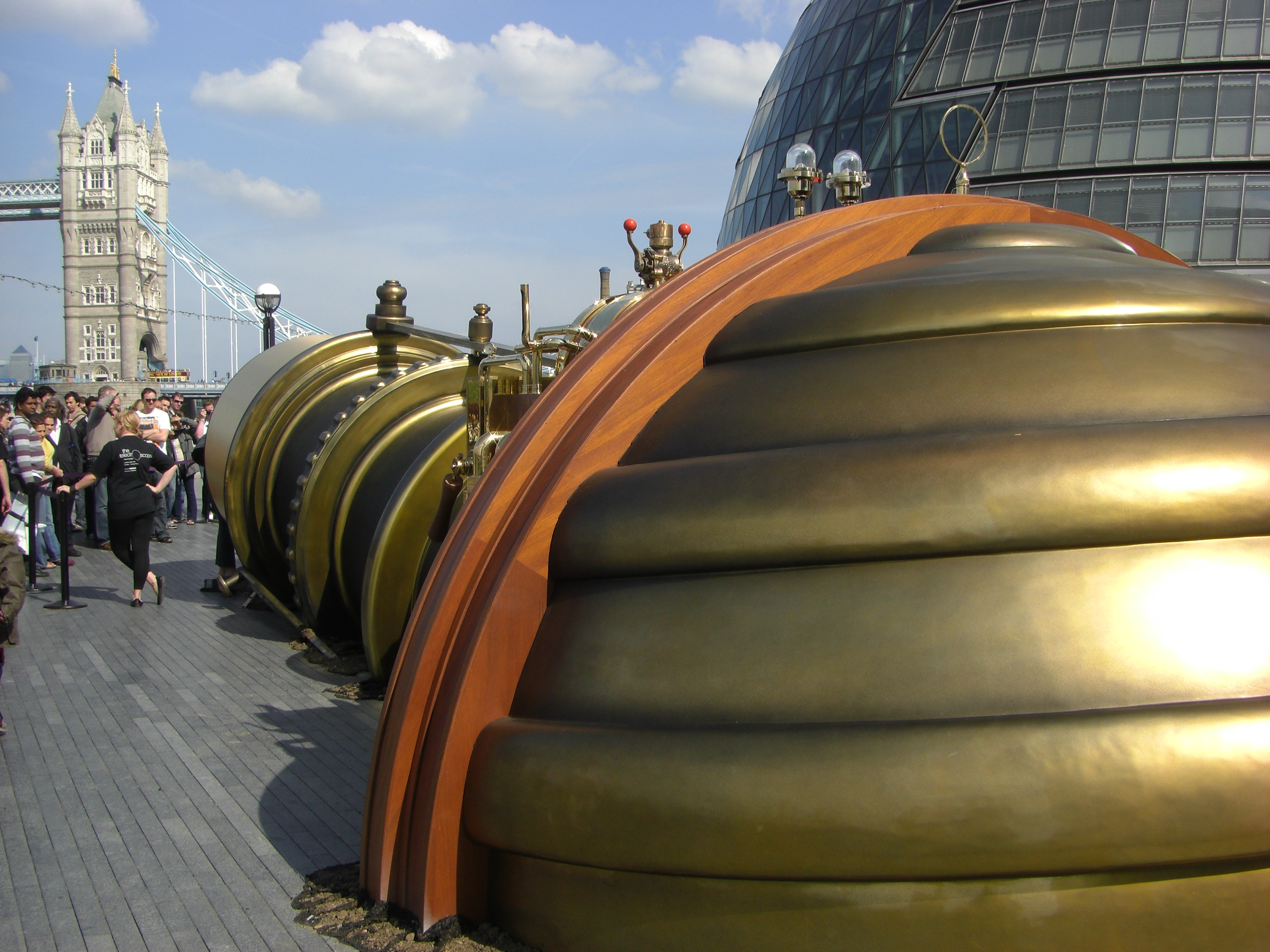
Paul St. George's Telectroscope installation at London City Hall (May 24, 2008)

== The Telectroscope art installation ==
In the recent era, 'telectroscope' was the name of a modern art installation constructed by Paul St George in 2008, which provided a visual link between London and New York City. In May–June 2008, artist Paul St George exhibited outdoor interactive video installations linking London and New York City as a fanciful telectroscope. According to the Telectroscope's back story, it used a transatlantic tunnel started by the artist's fictional great-grandfather, Alexander Stanhope St. George. In reality, the installation used two video cameras linked by a VPN connection to provide a virtual tunnel across the Atlantic. The connection used links of between 8 and 50 Mbit/s and the images were transmitted using MPEG-2 compression. The producer of this spectacle was the creative company Artichoke, who previously staged The Sultan's Elephant in London.

Observers in London viewing their counterparts in New York City as displayed on the faux-telectroscope

The concept of visually linking distant places and continents in real time was previously explored by Kit Galloway and Sherrie Rabinovitz with Hole in Space (1980), an art installation linking shop windows in New York and Los Angeles as well as by Maurice Benayoun with The Tunnel under the Atlantic between the Pompidou Centre in Paris and the Museum of Contemporary Art in Montreal (1995).

Later similar projects include the New York–Dublin Portal of 2024.

== See also ==
- Coaxial Cable -History
- History of radio
- History of television
- Telephonoscope
