= Quantum Conundrum =

2012 puzzle-platform video game

- Developer: Airtight Games
- Publisher: Square Enix
- Designer: Kim Swift
- Composer: Chris Ballew
- Engine: Unreal Engine 3
- Platforms: Microsoft Windows; PlayStation 3; Xbox 360
- Release: Microsoft Windows: WW: June 21, 2012; PlayStation 3: NA: July 10, 2012; EU: July 11, 2012; JP: July 24, 2012; Xbox 360: WW: July 11, 2012
- Genre: Puzzle-platform
- Mode: Single-player

Quantum Conundrum is a puzzle-platform game developed by Airtight Games and published by Square Enix. It was directed by Portal lead designer Kim Swift. The game was released for Microsoft Windows via Steam in June 2012, and for PlayStation 3 via PlayStation Network, and Xbox 360 via Xbox Live Arcade in July 2012.

== Plot ==
The silent player-protagonist is the twelve-year-old nephew of the highly intelligent, but somewhat eccentric, Professor Fitz Quadwrangle (voiced by John de Lancie). He is sent to stay with Quadwrangle, who is unprepared for his arrival as he is presently working on an experiment. The experiment goes awry, causing Quadwrangle to become trapped in a pocket dimension with a loss of memory of what went wrong before, but able to watch and communicate to the protagonist. The results of the experiment leave portions of the Quadwrangle mansion in flux between four dimensions with alternate properties. Quadwrangle guides the protagonist to acquire a glove that can tame these fluxes through which he can then safely travel through the labyrinth of rooms to reach three separate power generators and restart each, which Quadwrangle believes will allow him to escape the pocket dimension. The protagonist also gains help from IKE (Interdimensional Kinetic Entity), a small alien creature that Quadwrangle had adopted as a pet during his travels. As Quadwrangle guides his nephew, he tries to recall the exact events leading to the current situation.

After starting the three generators, the house begins to shake, and Quadwrangle realizes that a fourth generator must be started. The protagonist begins to activate the device, but Quadwrangle remembers too late that restarting the device had nearly killed him before and he had escaped to the pocket dimension for safety. With the device started, the house begins to shake violently, and Quadwrangle instructs his nephew to the safety of the pocket dimension, where he will be safe, while Quadwrangle can now work out how to resolve the problems of the half-ruined mansion, which is now affecting the entire planet.

== Gameplay ==
In-game screenshot, featuring Ike holding a Fluffy Dimension battery.

Quantum Conundrum is a puzzle-platformer viewed from the first-person perspective. As the boy protagonist, the player can run and jump, interact with various switches, and lift light objects. The player can die by falling into toxic liquids, bottomless pits, or falling from too great a height, and if hit by destructive lasers; this will restart the player at the start of a puzzle or a checkpoint if passed. The goal of each room is to reach its exit door, though it may be necessary to activate certain switches or other devices before the exit can become available.

Most puzzles require the player to manipulate the room and objects within it using four different dimensions which impart unique physical properties to the world. The four dimensions are the Fluffy dimension, where objects are ten times lighter than normal, allowing the character to pick up most non-fixed objects, the Heavy dimension, where objects are ten times heavier than normal; the player cannot pick up any objects, but their new density allows them to avoid destruction by laser beams, the Slow dimension, where time crawls to ten times slower than normal, though the player moves at normal speed, and the Reverse Gravity dimension, where gravity is reversed, though the player is unaffected by this. Only one dimension can be accessed at a time (including the normal dimension); when dimensions are switched, all objects retain their existing position and velocity, the latter becoming a critical factor in solving many of the game's puzzles. For example, with access to the Fluffy and Slow dimensions, the player can pick up a heavy safe in the Fluffy dimension, toss it towards a distant platform, and then immediately switch to the Slow dimension, giving themselves enough time to jump onto the safe as it crosses the gap to the platform.

Initially, the player does not have control of when the dimensions are shifted, but later gains access to the Interdimensional Shift Device glove where they can switch to any dimension so long as a battery for that dimension is placed in a power receptacle for that room. In some puzzles, the players must find and locate these batteries; in other cases, the player may have to choose which batteries to insert into place to solve a puzzle.

== Development ==
Kim Swift was one of the developers of 2007 video game Portal by Valve, an extension of her student team project Narbacular Drop from the DigiPen Institute of Technology. She also spent time helping to develop Left 4 Dead 2 after Portal's release. During that period, she came up with the general concept of Quantum Conundrum during a trip to a local bakery. During the initial states of the development of Portal 2, she had approached Airtight Games with the idea, who saw Swift's game concept as a means of expanding their own portfolio of games for a broader audience, and offered her a position there. Swift departed Valve for Airtight in late 2009, stating that with "the opportunity to work on innovative titles with my friends over at Airtight", she "couldn't pass it up". She initially worked with the team on a project that was later cancelled after about eight months; work on Quantum Conundrum began in the second quarter of 2010, while efforts to secure a publisher started in the following months.

Swift's goal with Quantum Conundrum was to create a title that would have broad appeal to a wide audience but still be challenging to hardcore players. She wanted to make a game like Portal in the puzzle genre, but worked to distance the concept from Portal to avoid direct comparisons. At Airtight, she worked in a democratic style with their small team of about sixteen people to offer ideas for their first game, similar to the nature of the smaller teams used on individual projects at Valve; though other ideas were offered, they fell back on her original concepts for Quantum Conundrum. This was in part due to the limited time and budget they would have for the game, and the ability for the team to quickly prototype the game within a few weeks and assure its playability. Swift started with her broader concept for the game, a means of having several dimensions and the ability to switch between them to solve puzzles, but did not have any specific dimensions in mind, and used the development process to figure out which ones worked best and offered the most interesting combinations with other dimensions.

The first two dimensions to be programmed were the Fluffy and Slow dimensions, upon which they brainstormed and tested other dimensions before narrowing on the final selection. They would also play-test puzzle concepts using open rooms with random objects within the various dimensions as to come up with puzzle mechanics; one such mechanic that came from this was to enter and exit the Reverse Gravity dimension to "ride" an object across a long gap. Swift made sure that puzzles that helped teach the player of the effects and potential tricks of each dimension were highlighted prior to moving on to more complex puzzles. Weekly playtests were done at Airtight to assure playability throughout the development process, in conjunction with tests performed by Square Enix.

The art style used throughout the game was aimed specifically to help guide the player towards specific features of each room, such as exits, switches, or the like. The use of skewed angled and curved surfaces helped to guide the player's eye, while also giving a "quirky and fun" look to the environments. Lighting and shadows were critical towards this aspect, using both to highlight features of rooms and point players towards specific elements. The game's soundtrack was composed and performed by Chris Ballew of The Presidents of the United States of America.

Two downloadable content packs have been announced for the game. Both add new rooms through a previously unexplored section of the mansion. The first, "The Desmond Debacle", was released across the various platforms in July and August 2012, while the second, "IKE-aramba!", was released a month later.

== Reception ==
Reception

Aggregate scores
Aggregator	Score
GameRankings	(X360) 79.58% (PC) 78.15% (PS3) 76.36%
Metacritic	(PS3) 79/100 (PC) 77/100 (X360) 76/100

Review scores
Publication	Score
1Up.com	B−
Destructoid	10/10
Game Informer	8.5/10
IGN	8/10

Quantum Conundrum received generally favorable reviews from critics. Aggregating review websites GameRankings and Metacritic gave the Xbox 360 version 79.58% and 76/100, the PC version 78.15% and 77/100 and the PlayStation 3 version 76.36% and 79/100. Destructoid gave Quantum Conundrum a perfect 10/10 score, claiming that "you are an idiot if you don't buy Quantum Conundrum." Game Informer gave it an 8.5/10, while praising the game saying "With its physics-warping mechanics, thoughtful brainteasers, and playful atmosphere, Quantum Conundrum should appeal to the legions of Portal fanatics." Bob Mackey of 1UP.com gave the game a B−, but stated: "But even in a vacuum, Conundrum's brilliant moments are hampered by an inconsistent world, an emphasis on performance rather than ingenuity, and a level of humor that wouldn't be out of place at your local pre-school." Some may complain that it's not as funny or as clever as Portal, but Quantum Conundrum is a unique experience that deserves attention nonetheless." IGN gave Quantum Conundrum an 8/10, praising the clever puzzles but criticizing "lack-luster" environments and the game's ending.

== Legacy ==
Square Enix announced in June 2012 that it was working with iam8bit to develop an advertising campaign, which is a spoof of a television game show based on the game, entitled The Super Dimensional Quantum Learning's Problems and Solutions Gametime Spectacular!!. The show is hosted by G4TV's Kevin Pereira. There are four episodes produced, each dealing with a different dimension. The shows involve putting players into scenarios based on the alternate dimensions from the game.
