= Tag: The Power of Paint =

2008 video game

- Developer: Tag Team
- Publisher: DigiPen Institute of Technology
- Programmers: Pongthep Charnchaichujit; Brett English; Tejeev Kohli; Theodore Rivera
- Artists: Pongthep Charnchaichujit; Joshua Jones; Tatsuang Tantakosol
- Composer: Tyler Woods
- Platform: Windows
- Release: May 1, 2008
- Genre: Puzzle-platform
- Mode: Single-player

Tag: The Power of Paint is a 2008 puzzle-platform game. The game was developed for Microsoft Windows by Tag Team, a group of students from the DigiPen Institute of Technology. The game's core mechanics is the use of a special paint sprayed from the player's paint gun to impart physical properties to surfaces, which, in turn, affect the user's movement. Tag won the Independent Games Festival Student Showcase award in the same year. The project team was hired by Valve, using the concepts of Tag as new puzzle elements in their game Portal 2.

== Gameplay ==
In Tag, the player uses a paint gun to spray surfaces with three types of paint so that they can then arrive at difficult-to-reach locations.

The player is tasked with maneuvering through nine different greyscale cityscapes, which serve as platform-oriented puzzles. To solve each puzzle, the player must use a paint gun that has the capacity for an unlimited quantity of three types of unique surface-altering paint. However, the cans for each paint type must be located in the level before the player can use that particular color. The earliest to be accessed is the green paint, which allows players to jump on horizontal surfaces, or bounce off of vertical surfaces while still gaining height. The second paint, red, causes the player to rapidly gain momentum. Blue paint, the final type, enables the player to walk on any surface, regardless of whether it is a vertical plane or ceiling. The paint gun also has a removal feature, which erases any paint that has been sprayed. Players are able to use a combination of the paints to help solve the puzzles: the player can coat two sides of a narrow vertical space with green paint to execute a wall jump to climb up, or can lay a path of red paint followed by green paint to create a long-distance jump. The player can only die if they fall off the level, though should this happen they would invariably be revived either at the start of the level or at the most recent checkpoint touched.

== Development ==
Tag was developed by a team of seven students as part of their course at the DigiPen Institute of Technology, and took approximately 18 months to create. This process included the writing of a complete 3-D game engine from scratch. Their initial concept involved emulating the playground game of tag, using paint to tag other players; the development of their base engine for this prototype took about four months. However, this idea was dropped when they found that the painting mechanics were more enjoyable than the actual tagging. For the second prototype, team included the former with additional power-ups that could be collected. Yet this decision was also revised and power-up functionality was finally transferred to the paint itself, a process that required the developers to redesign the game substantially five months before its projected release. While gauging the initial reactions to Tag, they found that players were easily frustrated with elements of the game. In response, the team developed an in-game editor to quickly iterate playtesting feedback into the level design. Although the developers chose to limit the length of the game to around a half-hour, to render it eligible for the Independent Games Festival, they agreed to produce a more professional version once they had obtained sufficient funding.

DigiPen released the game on Steam on April 18, 2022.

== Reception ==
Tag won the Student Competition at the Independent Games Festival in 2009. The developers have been praised by industry journalists for the music, the complexity of the puzzles, and the integration of the graphics with the game's mechanics. Travis Fahs proclaimed it to be the second best independent game of 2009, a "compelling piece of puzzle design", and one they hoped would develop into a full-scale commercial product. GameSpot commented that the game was a cross between Portal and Mirror's Edge, and applauded the simple and integrated mechanics.

Since the release of Tag, the programmers have been brought on as developers for Valve. Their work was incorporated into new puzzle elements involving the paint concept into Portal 2, in a similar manner that another DigiPen project team, Narbacular Drop, was brought into Valve with their work forming the basis of Portal.
