= Nonviolent video game =

Video games with little or no violence

Nonviolent video games are video games characterized by little or no violence. As the term is vague, game designers, developers, and marketers that describe themselves as non-violent video game makers, as well as certain reviewers and members of the non-violent gaming community, often employ it to describe games with comparatively little or no violence. The definition has been applied flexibly to games in such purposive genres as the Christian video game. However, a number of games at the fringe of the "non-violence" label can only be viewed as objectively violent.

The purposes behind the development of the nonviolent genre are primarily reactionary in nature. As video quality and level of gaming technology have increased, the violent nature of some video games has gained worldwide attention from moral, political, gender, and medical/psychological quarters. The popularity of violent video games and increases in youth violence have led to much research into the degree to which video games may be blamed for societally negative behaviors. Despite the inconclusive nature of the scientific results, a number of groups have rejected violent video games as offensive and have promoted the development of non-violent alternatives. The existence of a market for such games has in turn led to the manufacture and distribution of a number of games specifically designed for the nonviolent gaming community. Video game reviewers have additionally identified a number of games belonging to traditionally violent gameplay genres as "nonviolent" in comparison to a typical game from the violent genre. Despite the fact that some of these games contain mild violence, many of them have entered the argot of nonviolent gamers as characteristic non-violent games.

== Video game violence and attendant controversies ==
Controversies surrounding the negative influences of video games are nearly as old as the medium itself. In 1964, Marshall McLuhan, a noted media theorist, suggested in his book, Understanding Media: The Extensions of Man, that "[t]he games people play reveal a great deal about them". This was built upon in the early 1980s in an anti-video-game crusade spearheaded by the former Long Island PTA president, Ronnie Lamm, who spoke about her cause on the MacNeil/Lehrer NewsHour in December 1982. The same year, Surgeon General, C. Everett Koop, had suggested that games had no merit and offered little in the way of anything constructive to young people. Despite early general claims of the negative effects of video games, however, effects of these concerns were relatively minor prior to the early 1990s.

Discussion of the impact of violence in video games came as early as 1976's Death Race arcade game (a game with black and white graphics which involved running over screaming zombies). In the 1980s titles such as Exidy's Chiller (1986), Namco's Splatterhouse (1987) and Midway's NARC (1988) raised concerns about video game violence in the arcade. Home games such as Palace's Barbarian (1987) featured the ability to decapitate opponents. It was not until graphic capabilities increased and a wave of new ultra-violent titles were released in the early 1990s that the mainstream news began to pay significant attention to the phenomenon. In 1992, with Midway's release of the first Mortal Kombat video game, and then in 1993 with id's Doom, genuine controversy was first ignited as the wide and growing popularity of violent video games came into direct conflict with the moral and religious ethics of concerned citizens. Protests and game-bannings followed the publicizing of these conflicts, and controversies would erupt periodically throughout the 1990s with the releases of such games as Dreamweb (1992), Wolfenstein 3D (1992), Mortal Kombat II (1993), Phantasmagoria (1995), Duke Nukem 3D (1996), Blood (1997), Grand Theft Auto (1997), Carmageddon (1997), Postal (1997), Mortal Kombat 3 (1997), Carmageddon II: Carpocalypse Now (1998), Blood II: The Chosen (1998), Grand Theft Auto 2 (1999), and Requiem: Avenging Angel (1999) among others.

In April 1999, the fears of the media and violence-watch groups were legitimated in their eyes as investigations into the lives of Eric Harris and Dylan Klebold, the shooters in the Columbine High School massacre in Columbine, Colorado, revealed that they had been fans of the video game, Doom, and had even created levels for it today dubbed "the Harris levels". A great deal of discussion of violence in video games followed this event with strong arguments made on both sides, and research into the phenomenon which had begun during the 1980s received renewed support and interest.

In December 2001, Surgeon General David Satcher, led a study on violence in youth and determined that while the impact of video games on violent behavior has yet to be determined, "findings suggest that media violence has a relatively small impact on violence", and that "meta-analysis [had demonstrated that] the overall effect size for both randomized and correlational studies was small for physical aggression and moderate for aggressive thinking."

Despite this, the controversies and debate have persisted, and this has been the catalyst for the emergence of the non-violent video game genre. Non-violent video games are defined in the negative by a Modus tollendo ponens disjunctive argument. In other words, in order to recognize a non-violent game, an identifier must recognize the violent game as a distinct class. This has led to a degree of ambiguity in the term as it relies upon a definition of violence which for different identifiers may mean different things. In general, violence may be placed into at least three distinct categories:

- Totally non-violent games – Games in which absolutely no violence occurs. This category contains games characterized by lack of the death of characters, lack of sudden noise or movement, and often lack of traditional conflict. (e.g., Below the Root or Sudoku Gridmaster)
- Games in which the player acts non-violently – Games where violence occurs to the character-player as a result of environmental hazards or enemies but the character-player's reaction is to run away or otherwise distance himself from the violence.
  - Games with environmental hazards only – Games lacking enemies, but containing a potentially violent environment (e.g. Alleyway, or Roller Coaster)
  - Games with enemies – Games with violent enemies which the player-character must avoid (e.g. the Eggerland series)
- Games in which the player acts non-violently to other sentient beings – Games where a player acts violently against robots or other non-living non-sentient enemies (e.g. Descent)

=== Research ===
The history of video game development shares approximate contemporaneity with media violence research in general. In the early 1960, studies were conducted on the effects of violence in cartoons, and throughout the 1970s and 1980s a number of studies were conducted on how televised violence influenced viewers (especially younger viewers). The focus of many of these studies was on the effects of exposure of children to violence, and these studies frequently employed the social learning theory framework developed by Albert Bandura to explore violent behavioral modeling.

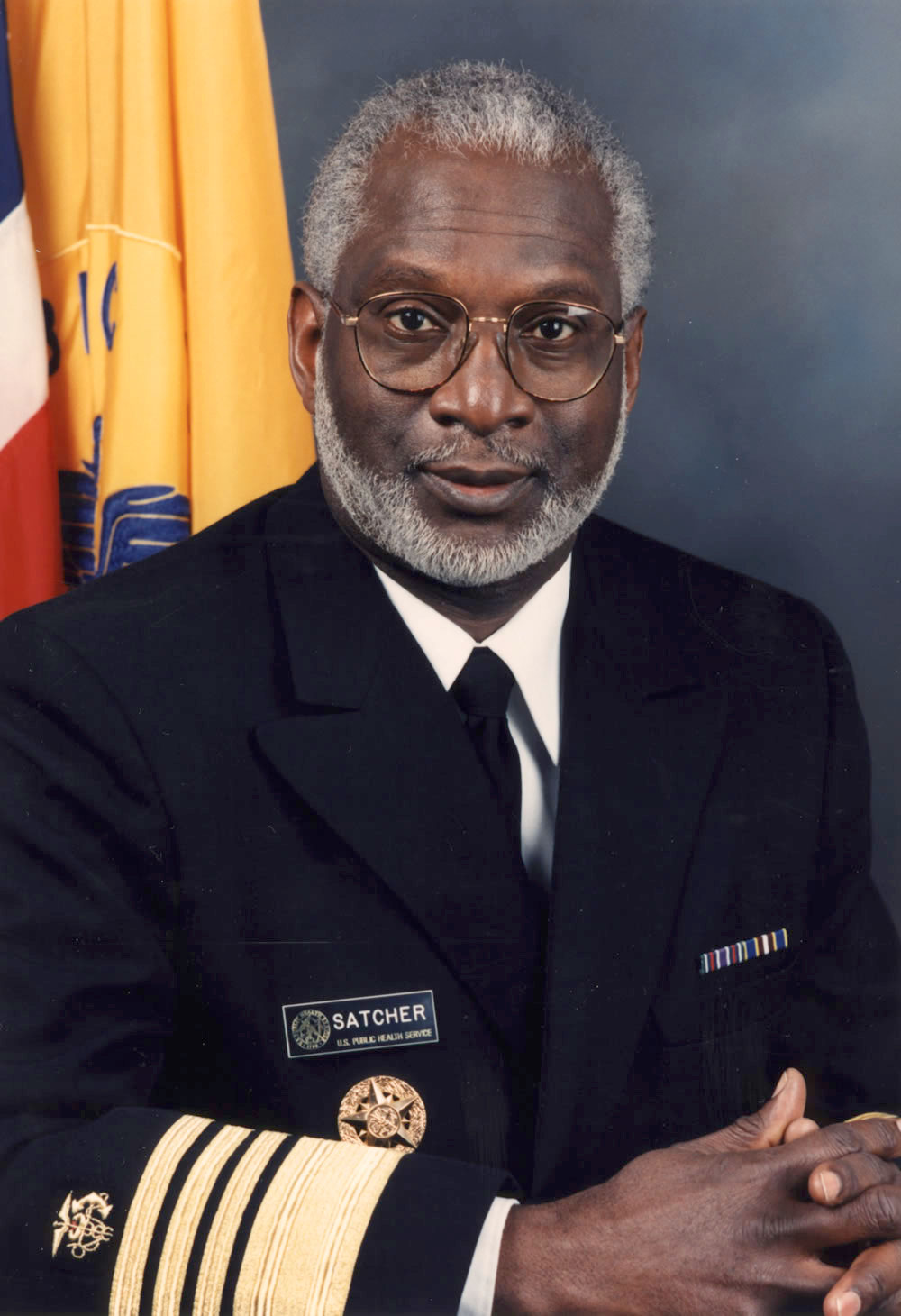
Surgeon General David Satcher has conducted research in the field of video game violence and has concluded that "findings suggest that media violence has a relatively small impact on [youth] violence."

With advancements in video technology and the rise of video games containing graphic violence in the late 1980s and early 1990s, media violence research shifted to a great degree from televised violence to video game violence. Although under current debate, a number of researchers have claimed that violent games may cause more intense feelings of aggression than nonviolent games, and may trigger feelings of anger and hostility. Theoretical explanations for these types of effects have been explained in myriad theories including social cognitive theory, excitation transfer theory, priming effect and the General Aggression Model. However recent scholarship has suggested that social cognitive theories of aggression are outdated and should be retired.

One difference between video games and television which nearly all media violence studies recognize is that video games are primarily interactive while television is primarily passive in nature. Video game players identify with the character they control in the video games and there have been suggestions that the interactivity available in violent video games narrows the gap between the theory and practice of youth violence in a manner that goes beyond the effects of televised violence. Acknowledgment of the fact that, for better or worse, video games are likely to remain a part of modern society has led to a brace of comparative studies between violent games and non-violent games. As technology has advanced, such studies have adapted to include the effects of violent games and non-violent games in new media methods such as immersive virtual reality simulations.

Results have varied, with some research indicating correlation between violence in video games and violence in players of the games, and other research indicating minimal if any relationship. Despite the lack of solid conclusion on the issue, the suggestion that violent games cause youth violence together with the clear popularity of violent video game genres such as the first-person shooter have led some game designers to publish non-violent alternatives.

=== Lawsuits and legislation ===
As research supporting the view that video game violence leads to youth violence has been produced, there have been a number of lawsuits initiated by victims to gain compensation for loss alleged to have been caused by video-game-related violence. Similarly, in the US Congress and the legislatures of states and other countries, a number of legislative actions have been taken to mandate rating systems and to curb the distribution of violent video games. At times, individual games considered too violent have been censored or banned in such countries as Australia, Greece, etc.

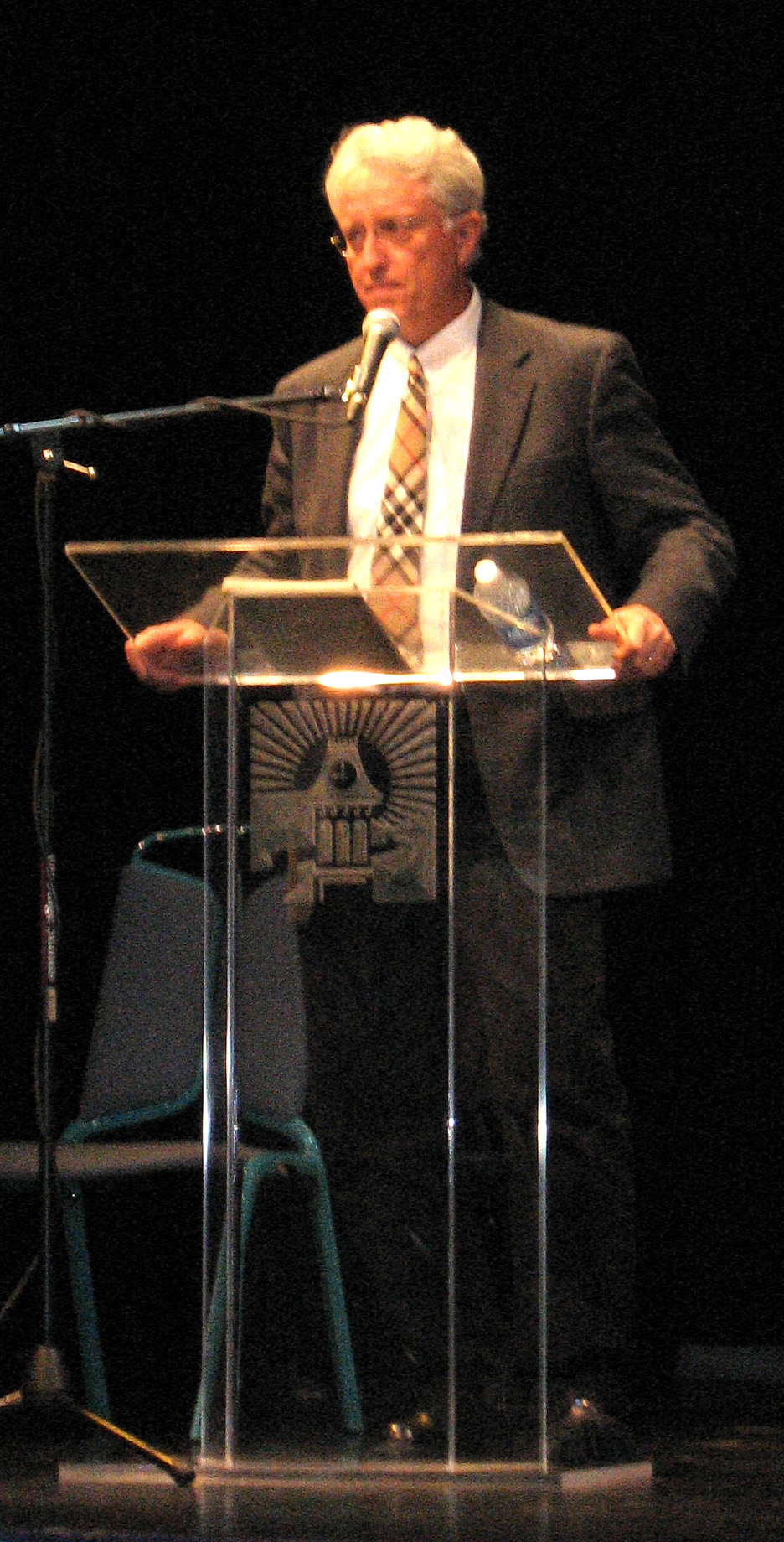
Former attorney Jack Thompson has filed lawsuits against the makers of violent games, alleging the violent content causes real-world violence.

In 1997, Christian conservative activist and (now former) attorney Jack Thompson brought suit against Atari, Nintendo, Sega, and Sony Computer Entertainment on behalf of the victims of 1997 Heath High School shooting in James v. Meow Media. The suit was dismissed in 2000, absolving the companies of responsibility for the shooter's actions based on a lack of remedy under Kentucky tort law. In 2002, the Sixth Circuit Court of Appeals upheld the dismissal, and in 2003, the U.S. Supreme Court denied certiorari, refusing to review the case because it was not dismissed on 1st Amendment grounds.

In 2000, the County Council for St. Louis, Missouri, enacted Ordinance 20,193 that barred minors from purchasing, renting, or playing violent video games deemed to contain any visual depiction or representation of realistic injury to a human or a "human-like being" that appealed to minors' "morbid interest in violence". This ordinance was challenged in 2001 by the Interactive Digital Software Association (IDSA) as violative of freedom of expression as guaranteed by the first amendment. The IDSA cited the 7th Circuit case of American Amusement Machine Association v. Kendrick as precedent suggesting that video game content was a form of freedom of expression, however in 2002 the Eastern District Court of Missouri ultimately issued the controversial ruling that "video games are not a form of expression protected by the First Amendment" in Interactive Digital Software Association v. St. Louis County.

In the aftermath of the Columbine High School massacre, a $5 billion lawsuit was filed in 2001 against a number of video game companies and id Software, the makers of the purportedly violent video game, Doom by victims of the tragedy. Also named in the suit were Acclaim Entertainment, Activision, Capcom, Eidos Interactive, GT Interactive, Interplay Entertainment, Nintendo, Sony Computer Entertainment, Square Co., Midway Games, Apogee Software, Atari Corporation, Meow Media, and Sega. Violent video games mentioned by name included Doom, Quake, Redneck Rampage, and Duke Nukem. The suit was dismissed by Judge Babcock in March 2002 in a ruling suggesting that a decision against the game makers would have a chilling effect on free speech. Babcock noted that "it is manifest that there is social utility in expressive and imaginative forms of entertainment, even if they contain violence."

In 2003, Washington State enacted a statute banning the sale or rental to minors of video games containing "aggressive conflict in which the player kill, injures, or otherwise causes physical harm to a human form in the game who is depicted by dress or other recognizable symbols as a public law enforcement officer." In 2004, this statute was subsequently declared an unconstitutional violation of the first amendment right to free speech in the Federal District Court case of Video Software Dealers Ass'n v. Maleng.

In 2005, Jack Thompson brought suit against Sony Computer Entertainment and Grand Theft Auto in representation of the victims of the Devin Moore shooting incident. On 7 November 2005, Thompson withdrew from Strickland v. Sony, stating, "It was my idea [to leave the case]." He was quick to mention that the case would probably do well with or without his presence. This decision followed scrutiny from Judge James Moore, however Thompson claimed he received no pressure to withdraw. At the same time, Judge James Moore had taken the motion to revoke Thompson's license under advisement. Jack Thompson appeared in court to defend his pro hac vice right to practice law in Alabama, following accusations that he violated legal ethics. Shortly thereafter, the case was dismissed and Thompson's license was revoked following a denial of his pro hac vice standing by Judge Moore who noted that "Mr. Thompson's actions before this Court suggest that he is unable to conduct himself in a manner befitting practice in this state." In March 2006, the Alabama Supreme Court upheld Judge Moore's ruling against the dismissal of the case.

In 2005, California State Senator, Leland Yee introduced California Assembly Bills 1792 & 1793 which barred ultra-violent video games and mandated the application of ESRB ratings for video games. Yee, a former child psychologist has publicly criticized such games as Grand Theft Auto: San Andreas and Manhunt 2, and opposes the U.S. Army's Global Gaming League. Both of these bills were passed by the assembly and signed by Gov. Arnold Schwarzenegger in October 2005. By December 2005, both bills had been struck down in court by Judge Ronald Whyte as unconstitutional, thereby preventing either from going into effect on 1 January 2006. Similar bills were subsequently filed in such states as Michigan and Illinois, but to date all have been ruled to be unconstitutional.

In 2005, in reaction to such controversial games as Grand Theft Auto: San Andreas, Senator Hillary Clinton along with Senators Joe Lieberman and Evan Bayh, introduced the Family Entertainment Protection Act (S.2126), intended to protect children from inappropriate content found in video games by imposing a federal mandate for inclusion of ESRB ratings. All three senators have actively sought restrictions on video game content with Sen. Lieberman denouncing the violence contained in video games and attempting to regulate sales of violent video games to minors, arguing that games should have to be labeled based upon age-appropriateness. Regarding Grand Theft Auto, Lieberman has stated, "The player is rewarded for attacking a woman, pushing her to the ground, kicking her repeatedly and then ultimately killing her, shooting her over and over again. I call on the entertainment companies—they've got a right to do that, but they have a responsibility not to do it if we want to raise the next generation of our sons to treat women with respect."

In June 2006, the Louisiana case of Entertainment Software Association v. Foti struck down a state statute that sought to bar minors from purchasing video games with violent content. The statute was declared an unconstitutional violation of the 1st Amendment. Amici filing briefs included Jack Thompson.

On 27 September 2006, Senator Sam Brownback (R-KS) introduced the United States Truth in Video Game Rating Act (S.3935). The act would require the ESRB to have access to the full content of and hands-on time with the games it was to rate, rather than simply relying on the video demonstrations submitted by developers and publishers. Two days later, Congressman Fred Upton introduced the Video Game Decency Act (H.R.6120) to the House.

=== Degrees of violence ===
Video game rating boards exist in a number of countries, typically placing restrictions (suggested or under force of law) for content that is violent or sexual in nature. About 5% of games fall into a category rated "mature" and recommended to those 17 years old and older. Those games account for about a quarter of all video game sales. Gamers seeking violence find themselves increasingly age restricted as identified violence level increases. This means that non-violent games, which are the least restricted, are available to all players at any age. This moral or legislative public policy against violence has the indirect effect of encouraging players of all ages and especially younger players to play non-violent games, however it also produces something of a forbidden fruit effect. For this and other reasons, the effectiveness of rating systems such as the ESRB to actually curb violent gameplay in youth gaming has been characterized as futile.

Table of violence ratings

Violence Level/Rating System	(United States) (Canada) (Mexico) ESRB	(Australia) ACB	(New Zealand) OFLC	(United Kingdom) BBFC & PEGI	(European Union) PEGI	(Finland) PEGI	(Germany) USK	(Brazil) ClassInd	(Japan) CERO	TIGRS
Exceeding violence						Banned				
Brutal violence							18			
Extreme violence	AO		Banned						Z	
Sexual violence			Banned						Labeled	
Gross violence				Noted						
Intense violence										Noted
Strong violence								16/18		
Historical violence							12			
Realistic violence										Labeled
Fictional violence							12			
Fantasy violence	E/E10+									Labeled
Cartoon violence	E/E10+									Labeled
Violence	T/M	RC	Banned	Noted	Labeled			14	Labeled	
Moderate violence							16			
Mild violence	E/E10+							10/12		Noted
Minimal violence	E						12			
Non-violent	EC	G		U	3+		Alle	L	A	Family Friendly
Rape										Noted
Glorified Human rights violations							18			
Glorified war							18			
Blood and Gore	AO									Noted
Realistic Blood										Noted
Blood	M									Labeled
Animated blood	E10+									Noted
Moderate blood							18			
Minimal blood	T									
No blood	EC	G		U	3+		Alle/6/12/16	L	A	Family Friendly

== Gender perspective ==
Games such as Nintendo's Barbie have been designed specifically to target female markets and contains little or no violence in keeping with what some Gender HCI studies have suggested appeals more to female audiences.

A number of studies have been conducted specifically analyzing the differences between male and female preference in video game styles. Studies have vacillated between findings that the gender effect on violence preference in games is significant and insignificant, however no firm conclusions have been achieved to date. The number of studies in this field has blossomed contemporaneously with greater gender studies, and a degree of tension exists in the field between the traditional stereotype of violence as a male-dominant characteristic and the realities of the marketing data for violent games.

In 2008, an example of such studies was funded by the Office of Juvenile Justice and Delinquency Prevention, U.S. Department of Justice to the Center for Mental Health and Media. These studies were released in the book, Grand Theft Childhood, wherein it was found that among girls, nine of the "top ten [most popular video games] were nonviolent games such as Mario titles, Dance Dance Revolution or simulation games" compared to a majority of violent games in the top ten favorites of boys. Ultimately, the conclusion reached in Grand Theft Childhood was that "focusing on such easy but minor targets as violent video games causes parents, social activists and public-policy makers to ignore the much more powerful and significant causes of youth violence that have already been well established, including a range of [non-gender-linked] social, behavioral, economic, biological and mental-health factors." This conclusion supports Surgeon General Satcher's 2001 study (supra).

Despite this conclusion, general awareness of the issue together with traditional stereotyping has led a number of game developers and designers to create non-violent video games specifically for female audiences. Advertisement placement and other marketing techniques have in the past targeted women as more receptive to non-violent video game genres such as life simulation games, strategy games, or puzzle video games. Although these genres often contain certain degrees of violence, they lack the emphasis on graphic violence characterized for instance by the first-person shooter genre.

== Religious perspective ==
Criticism for the violent aspects of video game culture has come from a number of anti-violence groups, and perhaps the most vocal of these are the numerous religious opposition groups. The moral codes of nearly all major religions contain prohibitions against murder and violence in general. In some cases this prohibition even extends to aggression, wrath, and anger. Violent video games, while merely vicarious in nature, have been the focus of religious disapproval or outrage in various circles. Notable anti-violent-video-game crusader, former attorney Jack Thompson is a self proclaimed Christian conservative, and his legal actions against violent video games have been intimately linked to his religious views. As groups like the fundamentalist Christian population have increased in number of adherents, new marketing opportunities have developed contemporaneously. Several religion-centric games forums such as GameSpot's "Religion and Philosophy" forum have developed within the greater gaming community in reaction to this growing niche.

=== Christian games ===
There has been a rapid increase in Christian video games since the 2000s, however as Christian games have striven to compete with their more popular secular progenitors, there has been an increasing number of games released that blur the lines between Christian and non-Christian values. Jack Thompson, for instance, has publicly decried such Christian games as Left Behind: Eternal Forces, stating "It's absurd, ... you can be the Christians blowing away the infidels, and if that doesn't hit your hot button, you can be the Antichrist blowing away all the Christians." (The game reviewers IGN, Ars Technica and GameSpy have disagreed that Left Behind: Eternal Forces is overtly violent.) Similarly, James Dobson, PhD., founder of the Focus on the Family group, has advised parents in relation to video games to "avoid the violent ones altogether.

In the Christian video game, Super 3D Noah's Ark, the player takes the role of Noah as he non-violently shoots food with a slingshot in order to sate hordes of ravening animals.

Although Christian games have been around since Sparrow Records' Music Machine for the Atari 2600, there have been few genres as unassailably violent as that of the first-person shooter (FPS). The majority of games that have been banned for violence have been FPS games, and for this reason, Christian games in the FPS genre have struggled to overcome the blurring effects of the violence inherent to the genre. Games such as Revelation 7 and Xibalba, for instance, have attempted to avoid claims of violence by using "off the wall" absurdist humor with enemies such as flying, bat-winged clown heads (modeled after the biblical Jezebel) that shoot rays out of their nose, or alien Nazis (a mocking reference to Raëlian religious beliefs)

Some of these games, despite containing objectively violent content, have been affirmatively labeled "non-violent video games" by marketers and faith-based non-violent gaming communities. In direct response to the Columbine High School massacre (alleged to have been caused by the shooters' obsession with the game, Doom), Rev. Ralph Bagley began production on Catechumen, a Christian first-person game produced by N'Lightening Software involving holy swords instead of guns. In Catechumen, the player fights inhuman demons using holy armament. When "sent back" the demons produce no blood or gore, and for this reason it has been described as a non-violent game. The intent of Catechumen, according to Rev. Bagley, is "to build the genre of Christian gaming. People are tired of having these violent, demonic games dictating to their kids." Among Christian FPS games, a lack of gore has often been used as the minimum standard for non-violence. Christian game reviewers have at times characterized non-Christian games such as Portal and Narbacular Drop as comparatively non-violent games despite their lack of a Christian focus.

An example of a notable Christian video game organization is the Christian Game Developers Foundation, focusing on family-friendly gameplay and Biblical principles. Another well known Christian video game creator and distributor is Wisdom Tree, which is best known for its unlicensed Christian video games on the Nintendo Entertainment System.

=== Hindu games ===
In 2006, Escapist magazine reported that a Hindu first-person shooter entitled My Hindu Shooter was in the works. In My Hindu Shooter, a game based on the Unreal Engine, the player employs the Vedic abilities of astrology, Ayurvedic healing, breathing (meditation), herbalism, Gandharva Veda music, architecture (which let you purify demonic areas) and yagyas (rituals). Gameplay involved acquisition of the siddhis of clairvoyance, levitation, invisibility, shrinking and strength, and the ultimate goal of the game was to achieve pure consciousness by removing karma through completion of quests and cleansing the six chakras in ascending order. The only way to actually win the game is to complete it without harming or killing any other living creature. Despite the violence-free requirements of the main character, however, a player could die and be reincarnated in a number of different forms like a human, a pig, a dog, or a worm. Whatever form you came back as would limit the way in which you could interact with other characters in the game. Like the majority of games that have been labeled non-violent, violence in the game that is applied to the character rather than that the character applies is not considered to make the game a violent game.

=== Buddhist games ===
According to Buddhist morality, the first of the Five Precepts of Śīla is a personal rule of not killing. This moral guideline extends to human as well as non-human life. There are five conditions to violate the first precept:

1. The being must be alive.
2. There must be the knowledge that it is a sentient living being.
3. There must be an intention to cause death.
4. An act must be done to cause death.
5. There must be death, as the result of the said act.

As the first precept requires an actual living being to be killed to be considered as violated, Buddhists can still enjoy video games with violence because there is no real being that is dying or being hurt. The fuller extent of the first precept is to maintain a harmless attitude towards all. The main problem is the mind, which is the main focus of Buddhism. Violent video games tend to create ill-will and tension, thus it is not conducive for meditation practice. Other than that, the action of the mind also creates kamma (action) which will bear its fruit when the conditions are right.

Although primarily browser games, a number of stand-alone video games eschewing violence, such as the 2007 Thai game Ethics Game have been created that promote the Five Precepts and Buddhism generally. The Buddhist concept of dharma has been emphasized in a number of Buddhist games as a reaction to perceptions of the adharmic state of modern games. The concept of zen has also influenced a number of nonviolent video games such as Zen of Sudoku, and The Game Factory's Zenses series.

=== Jewish games ===
While the earliest games to feature a Jewish main character (the Wolfenstein series' William "B.J." Blazkowicz) are characterized by militant anti-Nazism, a number of non-violent Jewish games (such as the Avner series by Torah Educational Software) primarily aimed at younger audiences has emerged with the intention of promoting Jewish religious concepts related to the Torah. One notable non-violent game that explores Jewish themes is The Shivah, a puzzle-adventure game featuring a non-violent battle between Rabbis that takes the form of an insult swordfight.

=== Muslim games ===
Despite being noted for controversial violent games such as Under Ash, and Under Siege, Muslim developer Afkar Media has also produced at least one non-violent game entitled Road Block Buster. In Road Block Buster the hero must "jump around doing tricks to soldiers ... [attempt] to get over any barrier or road block implanted by Israeli Defense forces without using violence, [and] earn respect by helping surrounded people whom [sic] can't get through the separation walls."

=== Sikh games ===
Exceptionally rare, the few Sikh games (e.g. Sikh Game) in existence are primarily browser-based. Sarbloh Warriors was developed by Taranjit Singh as a game revolving around Sikh. It was planned for it to contain mild violence. In 2006, Singh complained that the game was unfairly stereotyped and that BBC misrepresented the game as "anti-muslim". The game was never released.

=== Bahá'í games ===
In January 2007, artist Chris Nelson produced a non-violent art game called The Seven Valleys which he exhibited during the ACSW conference at the University of Ballarat. Based on the Unreal Tournament engine, The Seven Valleys was designed with the intention of "illustrat[ing] the unillustratable, and 'subvert[ing]' the image of violent video games in the process." Nelson was interviewed by ABC Radio on the subject in February of the same month.

=== Taoist games ===
Video game publisher, Destineer's non-violent puzzle video game, WordJong for the Nintendo DS has been considered a Taoist puzzle game.

=== Religion neutral games ===
Non-profit organization Heartseed set out to produce several non-violent games, drawing inspiration from a claimed agreement between several religions under the sign of nonviolence: "Christianity, Hinduism, Islam, Buddhism, Taoism, Judaism and others, – because throughout all of them can be found a common thread of decency meant to propel us toward spiritual enlightenment". This project seems to have been discontinued.

== Types of non-violent video games ==
Non-violent video games as a genre are characterized as a genre by purpose. Unlike genres described by style of gameplay, non-violent video games span a wide number of gameplay genres. Defined in the negative, the purpose of non-violent games is to provide the player with an experience that lacks violence. Many traditional gameplay genres naturally lack violence and application of the term "non-violent video games" to titles that fall under these categories raises no questions regarding accuracy. For game developers and designers who self-identify as non-violent video game makers, however, the challenge has been to expand the concepts of non-violence into such traditionally violent gameplay genres as action games, role-playing games, strategy games, and the first-person shooter.

Emergent and more recent gameplay genres such as music video games are for the most part naturally non-violent. Purposive video game genres such as educational games also are primarily non-violent in nature. One criticism of educational video games is that many of these games have not been scientifically tested to see whether children learn the skills the games claim to teach. In a study performed in Chile, educational video games were put into some first and second grade classrooms. Children who had the games in their classroom showed more progress in math, reading comprehension, and spelling than the children who did not use games in their classrooms.

Other electronic game genres like audio games are also most frequently non-violent. The indisputably non-violent nature of these games are often considered self-evident by members of both the non-violent gaming community and the gaming community at large. As such they are often not explicitly identified as such. Typically, explicit identification is applied counterintuitively to titles where there might otherwise be a question concerning non-violence. This has led such categorization to be viewed with mistrust, hostility, and mockery by those who fail to recognize the comparative nature of the definition or who disagree fundamentally with the underlying purpose of the genre.

=== Traditionally non-violent games ===
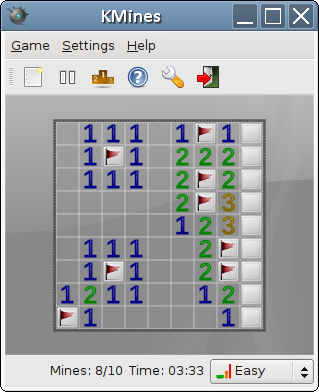
Games like Minesweeper contain traditionally non-violent puzzle game aspects, though minesweeper takes its name from a facet of war.

Among traditionally non-violent games are included maze games, adventure games, life simulation games, construction and management simulation games, visual novels, and some vehicle simulation games, among others. These games are generally less frequently described as non-violent due to the self-evident nature of the descriptive term. Prior to the development of games specifically designed for non-violence, non-violent gamers were limited to these traditionally non-violent genres, however a number of games even under the traditionally non-violent umbrella may be considered arguably violent. Minesweeper, for instance, is an abstraction of a scenario that often leads to a patently violent result.

Other common traditionally non-violent genres include puzzle games, music video games, programming games, party games, and traditional games.

Examples of traditionally non-violent games include:

- Sudoku Gridmaster – A totally non-violent game wherein the player must assign the mathematically appropriate number to the corresponding blank in a grid.
- Roller Coaster – A game featuring a non-violent main-character wherein the player must navigate a dangerous amusement park to collect pieces of money.
- Alleyway – A game with only environmental hazards featuring a non-violent main-character wherein the player must break blocks (mild violence) with a ball while avoiding the floor of the level.
- The Eggerland series – A series with enemies featuring a non-violent main-character wherein the player must solve block-sliding puzzles in order to secure a key and unlock the door to the next room.
- Robots – A game lacking violence to sentient beings wherein a player must either bomb malfunctioning robots or conserve bombs by stepping strategically in order to induce the robots to crash into one another.

=== Non-violent action games ===
Seiklus is a platformer that lacks much of the violence traditionally associated with platformers.

Action games have typically been among the most violent of video games genres with the liberal employment of enemies to thwart the actions of the player-character, and an emphasis on killing these enemies to neutralize them. As action games have developed they have become progressively more violent over the years as advances in graphic capabilities allowed for more realistic enemies and death sequences. Nevertheless, some companies like Nintendo have tended to shy away from this kind of realism in favor of cartoon and fantasy violence, a concept also implicated in the increase of youth violence by media violence researchers. This has created a spectrum of violence in action games. Non-violent video game proponents have labeled a number of games containing comparatively low-level violence as non-violent as well as games such as the anti-violent serious game, Food Force.

Studies have also shown that there are tangible benefits to violence in action games such as increased ability to process visual information quickly and accurately. This has led to support for the development of action games that are non-violent which will allow players to retain the positive visual processing benefits without the negatives associated with violence.

Examples of non-violent action games include:

- Journey – Multi-awarded Game of the Year, Journey is a game where a non-violent player meets and travels with a second anonymous player on a journey to a mountaintop.
- Seiklus – A totally non-violent game wherein the player traverses a natural landscape as a small person in order to get to the end.
- Sunday Funday – A game featuring a non-violent main-character wherein the player avoids bullies, clowns, and businessmen in order to skateboard to Sunday school.
- Knytt – A game with only environmental hazards featuring a non-violent main-character wherein the player must guide a small creature through a series of caverns and mountains containing pitfalls and hazards in order to get to the end.
- Marble Madness – A game with enemies featuring a non-violent main-character wherein the player must navigate his way through a marble maze while enemy marbles and other enemies attempt to knock him off or otherwise destroy him.
- Barbie – A game lacking violence to sentient beings wherein Barbie must rescue Ken by defeating a host of shopping-mall-related machines gone haywire.
- Barney's Hide and Seek – A game lacking violence to any living creature; the player must find children and missing objects. The game is also educational and teaches young children about safety lessons.
- Crash Dummy Vs The Evil D-Troit
- Treasure Quest – a puzzle/action game
- Knytt Stories
- Steer Madness – a vegetarian-themed game endorsed by PETA

==== Non-violent first person shooters ====
The application of the term "non-violent" to genres such as the first-person shooter (FPS), that many players consider inherently or definitionally violent, has at times generated vociferous arguments that the concept is inconceivable and at best oxymoronic. This argument typically derives from a strict definition of violence as "extreme, destructive, or uncontrollable force especially of natural events; intensity of feeling or expression, " a definition by which the vast majority of video games may be described as violent. Despite arguments to the contrary, however, such characterizations have been employed as a marketing tool by makers and distributors of non-violent video games, and the degree of popularity enjoyed by games so described may be attributed to the comparative violence of other more violent members of the supergenre.

Non-violent first-person shooter developers have expressed the notion that it is the challenge of making a non-violent game in a violent genre that motivates them in part. Rarely, FPS games such as Garry's Mod and Portal that have been developed without the specific intent of non-violence have been identified by reviewers and the non-violent gaming community as non-violent FPSes. Such characterizations have led to the concern that parents may allow their children to play these games, not realizing that there are still some elements of violence including violent deaths. Further ambiguities arise when determining whether a game is a first-person shooter, as in certain games such as Narbacular Drop, the player doesn't shoot anything at all, but merely clicks walls with the cursor. Similarly, in games such as realMyst, the player merely interacts with the environment by touching things in the first-person and the term "shooter" is seen to be objectively inaccurate. Despite this, non-violent first-person games have often been characterized oxymoronically as shooters because of all comparable genres, these games are most closely similar to the FPS and often employ engines designed for the FPS genre.

Often modeled upon violent FPS games, non-violent FPSes such as Chex Quest or the newer Sherlock Holmes games, may bear striking resemblance to the violent game whose engine they are using. Developers of such games often have done little to change the game other than replacing violent or scary imagery and recasting the storyline to describe "zorching", "slobbing", or otherwise non-lethally incapacitating enemies. Examples of simple changes intended to reduce violence for non-violent FPSes include the alteration of the red shroud from the death-sequence in Doom to become the green shroud from the slime-sequence in Chex Quest or the removal of the red shroud from the death-sequence in Half-Life 2 for the deaths in Portal. At times, similarities between violent progenitors and their non-violent descendants have proved strong enough that the non-violent developers have cast their game as a spoof of the violent version. This is apparent in Chex Quest. Off-beat and absurdist humor have been employed in a number of games order to tone down the serious content by makers of non-violent FPSes.

One subgenre of the FPS that typically is not characterized as non-violent despite the fact that gameplay revolves to a great degree around avoidance of battle, is that of stealth games. Although much of the gameplay characteristic to stealth games accords closely with the requirements of the non-violent genre, stealth games most frequently simply delay chaotic violence to focus instead upon controlled precision violence. When stealth and violence are both present as options, stealth is often presented as the superior option for being morally superior or requiring greater skill.

Examples of non-violent FPSes include:

- H.U.R.L. – A game featuring a non-violent main-character wherein the player must navigate a playing-field avoiding enemies as they attempt to "slob" him with trash.
- Narbacular Drop – A game with only environmental hazards featuring a non-violent main-character wherein the player must navigate her way out of a dungeon filled with hazards.
- Chex Quest – A game with enemies featuring a non-violent main-character wherein the player must rescue his fellow cereal-pieces by "zorching" hordes of flemoids back to their home planet with various zorch guns. Instead of the player's face bleeding, the Chex piece becomes progressively more covered in slime.
- Descent – A game lacking violence to sentient beings wherein the player, in a ship, rescues human miners trapped in mines guarded by malfunctioning mining robots. The player has to navigate maze-like mines in order to save the hostages and shutdown the malfunctioning mine.
- Chex Quest 2 – The sequel of the original Chex Quest, featuring the same premise of non-violent action.
- Elebits – A Wii-based first-person hide-and-seek game
- Gotcha! Extreme Paintball – A non-lethal paintball FPS
- Extreme Paintbrawl – A non-lethal paintball FPS
- Foreign Ground – A military game made by the Swedish Defence University, created only for corporate training environments.
- Greg Hastings Tournament Paintball – A non-lethal paintball FPS
- Greg Hastings Tournament Paintball MAX'D – A non-lethal paintball FPS
- Ken's Labyrinth – a non-violent Wolfenstein clone
- Laser Arena – non-violent arena-style laser tag FPS
- Nerf Arena Blast – A non-lethal Nerf FPS
- NRA Gun Club – A first-person target-shooting game
- Super 3D Noah's Ark – A non-violent Christian video game
- Nanashi no Game – non-violent survival horror first-person game from Japan
- Catechumen — Another non-violent Christian video game where the player uses the “Sword of the Spirit” to convert possessed Roman soldiers into Christians.

=== Non-violent role-playing games ===
The Christian RPG, Spiritual Warfare, features a non-violent hero who spreads repentance by sharing holy fruit.

Though infrequently regarded as explicitly violent, role-playing video games (RPGs) have traditionally focused on the adventures of a party of travelers as they spend days and months leveling-up to fight greater and greater foes. Fighting in these games is highly stylized and often turn-based, however the actions of the player-characters and the enemies that attack them are distinctly violent. There have been some attempts made to reduce this violence by rendering it in cartoonish format as in some members of the Final Fantasy series or by recasting the enemies' deaths as "fainting", "sleeping", or becoming "stunned" as in the Pokémon series; however neither of these series has been explicitly labeled non-violent.

One rare example of an RPG that was designed as a non-violent video game is Spiritual Warfare, a game with enemies featuring a non-violent main-character wherein the player wanders about converting the denizens of his town to Christianity while fending off the attacks of wild animals with holy food. Another example is A Tale in the Desert, an MMORPG based on economic development.

Secular examples include Capcom's Ace Attorney series and Victor's Story of Seasons series – a simulation/RPG game. Additionally, such RPGs as Ultima IV: Quest of the Avatar, Planescape: Torment, and Deus Ex have all been identified as containing certain modes of play that are mostly non-violent. This concept is also explored in the higher difficulty levels of the Thief series.

The fan-funded indie RPG Undertale and its "sister game" Deltarune allow players to resolve conflicts through peaceful means.

=== Non-violent strategy games ===
As with role-playing games, strategy games have traditionally focused on the development and expansion of a group as they defend themselves from the attacks of enemies. Strategy games tend not to be explicitly described as violent, however they nearly universally contain violent content in the form of battles, wars, and other skirmishes. Additionally, strategy games tend to more often strive for realistic scenarios and depictions of the battles that result. Counteracting this violence, however, is the fact that strategy games tend to be set at a distant third party perspective and as such the violence of the battles tends to be minute and highly stylized.

For the most part, non-violent groups have not explored this genre of violent game. Gender-marketers have designed strategy games for both male and female audiences, however gender-linked treatment of violence has not occurred in this genre and as such, male- and female-oriented strategy games tend to contain equal degrees of violence. Christian developers have made various attempts at the genre including Left Behind: Eternal Forces in which the player attempts to convert as many civilians in an apocalyptic future as possible by raising their spirit level and shielding them from the corrupting influences of rock-and-roll music and general secularism. The game has been criticized by such anti-violent video game personalities as former attorney Jack Thompson for strategy involving the slaying of infidels and non-believers, and for the ability of players engaged in multi-play modes to play as the Antichrist on the side of the Forces of Satan.

Secular non-violent video game designers have emerged from the serious games movement and include such anti-violence titles as PeaceMaker, a game where the player tries to foster peace between Israelis and Palestinians, and A Force More Powerful, a nonviolence-themed game designed by Steve York, a documentary filmmaker and director of Bringing Down a Dictator, a non-violent resistance film featuring Ivan Marovic, a resistance leader against Slobodan Milošević who was instrumental in bringing him down in 2000. Though these games are anti-violent, however, failure on the part of the player leads to violence. Thus the goal of the game is merely shifted to active violence-prevention while the degree of violence used to challenge the player remains consistent with violent strategy games.

Some examples of relatively nonviolent strategy games include:

- Dorfromantik
- E.T.: Cosmic Garden
- Mudcraft
- M.U.L.E.
- Outpost Kaloki X – a strategy/simulation game

=== Non-violent sports games and non-violent vehicle simulations ===
According to the Funk and Buchman method for classifying video games, there are six categories into which games may be divided:

1. general entertainment (no fighting or destruction)
2. educational (learning or problem solving)
3. fantasy violence (cartoon characters that must fight or destroy things, and risk being killed, in order to achieve a goal)
4. human violence (like fantasy violence, but with human rather than cartoon characters)
5. nonviolent sports (no fighting or destruction)
6. sports violence (fighting or destruction involved)

The separation of violent and nonviolent sports here illustrates a phenomenon also recognizable in the vehicle simulation game genre. With both sport and vehicle simulation games, gameplay has traditionally been highly bipolar with nearly as many violent titles as non-violent. Just as there are non-violent and violent sports games, so too are there flight and combat flight simulators, space flight and space combat simulators, and racing games and vehicular combat games. Distinction of games as violent or non-violent here serves a purely practical purpose as gameplay may differ considerably beyond the merely aesthetic.

Such sports as ping-pong, golf, and billiards have in the past been identified as nonviolent. A common example of a nonviolent game that has been employed in a number of studies and government committee reports is NBA Jam: Tournament Edition.

An example of a notable non-violent sports game company is Kush Games.

== See also ==
- A Modest Video Game Proposal
- Christian video games
- Nonviolence
- Pacifism
