= Perspective (video game) =

2012 video game

- The logo of the video game.
- Developer: DigiPen Institute of Technology
- Publisher: DigiPen Institute of Technology
- Producer: Pohung Chen
- Designers: Logan Fieth; Jason Meisel
- Programmers: Pohung Chen; Jason Meisel; Sean Reilly
- Artists: Laura Borgen; Ariel Gitomer; Edward Peters
- Composer: M.J. Quigley
- Engine: Microsoft XNA
- Platform: Microsoft Windows
- Release: December 12, 2012
- Genres: Platform, puzzle
- Mode: Single-player

Perspective is an experimental puzzle video game that includes aspects of a 2-dimensional platform game. The player moves the avatar through a 2D screen that changes based on the player's camera angle in 3D space. This perspective-shifting mechanic is used to reach a goal at the end of each level. When the player takes control of the camera angle, the 2D avatar is locked in place until the player decides to return to 2D mode.

Overall, Perspective was very well received by critics, who singled out the unique game mechanics and level design as strong features.

== Gameplay ==
The player's goal is to move an avatar to a goal. The game is played by switching between 2D and 3D modes: in 2D mode, the avatar can move but the field of view is fixed. In 3D mode, the player can move and change the field of view but the avatar is fixed in 3D space. Each level is made up of rooms and corridors with blue and orange platforms across the walls of the level. The avatar can walk on the blue platforms in 2D mode and is unable to pass through them. If the avatar touches an orange platform, it goes back to where it was before it entered 2D mode. No matter where the player is, the avatar always stays the same size in relation to the screen. As a result, the player is able to fit the avatar through spaces that appear to be impossible at first sight. The levels are organized using a main hub, which is a separate level in itself that has to be navigated in the same way as the regular levels. Each new level is unlocked when the previous one is beaten; levels generally increase in difficulty as the player progresses through the game. Some bonus levels are unlocked by completing regular levels.

== Development ==
Perspective was made available for download for free on December 12, 2012. Development for the game began as a junior year school project in May 2011. None of the people working on the game were able to work on it full-time. Several developers had different goals when developing the game:

We stumbled upon the core mechanics behind Perspective pretty early on. Our goal was to create a game that explores those mechanics in new and interesting ways. From the start we knew that this is a game that would have a lot of challenges. These challenges ranged from getting the core technology working to designing the game in such a way that carefully balanced between difficulty and approachability.

— Pohung Chen

My goal from the start was to make fun puzzles with the mechanic. It sounds weird, but the mechanic is "overpowered" in a lot of ways. The player could potentially break a lot of puzzles with the mechanic, so I had to strike a balance between limiting the player and letting them roam free. The other goal I have had with the level design is to keep the game from being reflex-intensive. Yes, you do control a platforming character, but the player should never feel like they are performing a platforming challenge. The goal is for all of the levels to be focused on the puzzle-solving.

— Logan Fieth

The game was heavily inspired by Portal and borrows the tagline "Can you think with perspective?" from the game as well as the orange and blue color scheme. Other inspiration for level design came from Braid.

== Reception ==
The game was praised by PC Gamer as "mind-bending". Indie Game Magazine praised it as "mind-blowing" and "excellent", and Blame It On The Voices called it "revolutionary". Rock, Paper, Shotgun called it "remarkably clever[,] not just in the idea itself ... but in the construction of the puzzles which make use of that concept." According to Eurogamer, "Perspective looks to be an innovative puzzle/platformer". Gamezebo gave the game 5 out of 5, stating "the controls are spot on, the puzzles are consistently glorious, and it's all wrapped up in a neat little package."

At the 2013 Independent Games Festival, Perspective was a finalist in the Technical Excellence category.
