= Murdered: Soul Suspect =

2014 video game

- Developers: Airtight Games; Square Enix Business Division 4 (Note: Credited as Square Enix Extreme Edges Team.)
- Publisher: Square Enix
- Directors: Yosuke Shiokawa; Matthew Brunner
- Producer: Cale Schupman
- Designers: Derek Chatwood; Jason Olander; Ian P. Riutta; Derek Warner
- Programmer: Timothy Reeves
- Artist: Dennis Price
- Writers: Yosuke Shikawa; Anna Megill; John Sutherland; Doug Van Horne
- Composer: Jason Graves
- Engine: Unreal Engine 3
- Platforms: PlayStation 3; PlayStation 4; Windows; Xbox 360; Xbox One
- Release: NA: June 3, 2014; AU: June 5, 2014; EU: June 6, 2014; JP: July 17, 2014 (PS3, PS4 & X360); JP: September 4, 2014 (XONE)
- Genres: Action-adventure, stealth
- Mode: Single-player

Murdered: Soul Suspect (Note: Japanese: マーダード 魂の呼ぶ声, Hepburn: Murdered: Tamashii no Yobu Koe) is a 2014 action-adventure stealth video game developed by Airtight Games and Square Enix. The game was released in June 2014 for PlayStation 3, PlayStation 4, Windows, Xbox 360, and Xbox One. The game is played in a third-person view as the player navigates the protagonist, detective Ronan O'Connor, around a fictionalized version of Salem, Massachusetts. The story centers on Ronan as he hunts down an infamous serial killer known as the Bell Killer. After being killed by the Bell Killer at the beginning of the game, Ronan returns as a ghost. He is then informed by his long-dead wife, Julia, that he must solve the Bell Killer mystery so he can rejoin her.

Murdered: Soul Suspect received an average reception upon release; most of the criticism centered around the poor combat, short length, lack of replay value, and lack of difficulty. The game did, however, receive praise for some aspects of its story and its original concept.

== Gameplay ==
Murdered: Soul Suspect takes place in a fictionalized version of Salem, Massachusetts. Played in a third-person view, the player navigates the protagonist, Ronan O'Connor, around town. There are multiple areas in Salem to explore, such as an apartment building, a church, and a graveyard. The player completes levels in order to progress further into the game. There are numerous collectibles in the game, including "Ghost Girl Messages" and various different types of scraps of paper, which contain information about Ronan's life. Since Ronan is a ghost, he has a number of ghostly abilities such as teleportation and possession. Each area has clues to collect to progress through the level and the story; the clues are found in a way similar to L.A. Noire's investigation sequences.

== Plot ==
In present day Salem, Massachusetts, a serial killer known as the Bell Killer begins murdering seemingly unconnected victims. Detective Ronan O'Connor, who has a dark past, is able to track down the Bell Killer at the Regal Apartments. However, he gets thrown out of a window. After being shot to death, Ronan returns in the form of a ghost, and learns that in order to reach the afterlife and meet his wife Julia, he must first discover the identity of his killer. With the help of Abigail, the ghost of a Puritan child, Ronan is able to use his ghostly abilities to return inside the Regal Apartments, where he discovers a medium named Joy Foster witnessed the fight, and is now hiding at St. Benedict's Church.

Joy is in search of her missing mother, Cassandra, who was consulting with the police on the Bell Killer case, and initially refuses to help Ronan and attempts to break into the police station, only to be arrested. Ronan travels there and helps her escape, as she can help him interact with the physical world and track down his killer. While leading Joy out of the station, Ronan discovers that Baxter, a hostile fellow officer holding onto Ronan's criminal files, was the one working with Cassandra. Cassandra's research leads the pair to the Ashland Hills Cemetery to investigate a possible Bell Killer victim. After pursuing the ghost of the young drowned girl, Sophia, Ronan's ghostly powers allow him to view flashbacks of the murder. Sophia reveals that the Bell Killer asked her about a "contract".

A review of Cassandra's research leads the pair to the Lux Aeterna Psychiatric Hospital to find the Bell Killer's surviving victim, Iris Campbell. Infiltrating the facility, they learn Iris possesses the same ability to see ghosts and realize the Bell Killer is killing psychic mediums. It is then revealed that Iris is possessed by the spirit of her sister, Rose, whom the Bell Killer burned alive after she helped Iris escape. While Rose, Iris, and Joy return to the church, Ronan investigates a museum exhibit about the Salem witch trials. There, he deduces that the Bell Killer is executing his victims as if they are witches; psychic flashbacks reveal that Baxter suspiciously concealed evidence at the museum about the Bell Killer. Believing Baxter is the Bell Killer, Ronan leaves the museum and notices several police cars heading toward the church.

Once there, Ronan learns that the Bell Killer attacked the building, crushing Iris to death, and slaughtering several people who stood in his way. Although Joy is safe, she is re-arrested and taken away by Ronan's brother-in-law, Javier "Rex" Reyes, the lead detective on the Bell Killer case. Investigating the church, Ronan realizes that the Bell Killer is hiding in the derelict Judgment House. There, Ronan discovers evidence of the Bell Killer's activities and clues implying that the killings have been occurring for hundreds of years.

When Ronan comes across Baxter's corpse, Baxter's ghost reveals he was murdered by the Bell Killer while secretly still investigating the case following his demotion. He also clarifies that he had been working with Cassandra and she is still alive before he leaves to find her. In the basement, flashbacks reveal that Abigail had been imprisoned there before she was hanged. Her execution came as punishment for accusing several innocent people of witchcraft, resulting in their deaths. In anger, Abigail drew a bell symbol on the floor, swearing that she would never stop until the bell tolled for all of the witches in Salem, as she believed they made a contract with demons to gain inhuman powers.

Following the evidence, Ronan returns to the museum to discover that Rex is the Bell Killer, having been possessed by Abigail. As he prepares to hang Joy, Ronan manages to force Abigail's spirit out of Rex, and the pair battle by inflicting painful memories on each other. These memories reveal that Abigail has possessed many people to carry out the Bell Killer murders before killing the possessed themselves. Among those Abigail possessed include Baxter, who killed Rose, and even Ronan himself, who killed Sophia.

Afterward, Abigail summons a portal of demons to swallow Ronan. However, he escapes and Abigail is submerged instead. Joy is saved and later reunites with her mother. Rex remains unaware of the crimes committed using his body. In the aftermath, Ronan hears Julia calling him and turns toward her voice.

== Development ==
The game came about because Square Enix wished to appeal more towards the Western market. Yosuke Shiokawa, a creative director at Square Enix, came up with the idea of a game where the player was a ghost and pitched it to the development team at Airtight Games. Airtight then came up with various concepts surrounding the ghost idea, some of which "were almost superhero stories" according to Matt Brunner, Airtight's chief creative officer. In an interview with IGN, Shiokawa noted that he was inspired from watching the movie Die Hard and asking himself "what if John McClane died? What if John McClane was killed? Is he going to give up?" He reasoned that he would not and that "even as a ghost he's going to try and save the people in Nakatomi Plaza, including his wife", which led to the initial concept of the game.

The team had trouble at first integrating Western and Eastern philosophies regarding ghosts. About the process, Brunner later stated, "There are a lot of assumptions that we weren't even aware of, that we were making on both sides, about how to fictionally support who you are as a character in this world. It took us, I would say, a good year and a half of constant back-and-forth to get that sense of, "What, really? Oh, so that's what you're talking about."

== Reception ==
Reception

Aggregate score
Aggregator	Score
Metacritic	PC: 59/100; PS4: 59/100; XONE: 51/100

Review scores
Publication	Score
Destructoid	4.5/10
Edge	4/10
Electronic Gaming Monthly	5.5/10
Eurogamer	6/10
Game Informer	6.5/10
GameSpot	6/10
GamesRadar+	2.5/5
Hardcore Gamer	2.5/5
IGN	5.5/10
Joystiq	3.5/5
Polygon	7/10
VideoGamer.com	4/10
Digital Spy	2/5
NowGamer	3.5/10

Murdered: Soul Suspect received an average reception upon release; most of the criticism centered around the poor combat, short length, lack of replay value, and lack of difficulty.

IGN's Lucy O'Brien called it "mediocre", criticizing it as leaving concepts unfinished and feeling "like a pick-a-path game where there's only one path." GameSpot's Tom McShea praised certain aspects of the story despite its issues, arguing "Murdered: Soul Suspect has a lot more spirit than its taciturn protagonist could ever muster."

Andrew Reiner of Game Informer was ambivalent towards the game, concluding "Despite its numerous shortcomings, I was entertained to the point of not wanting to put it down. It's a satisfying murder mystery and a sub-par game all rolled in one. The story won out in the end for me. If you can tolerate the shoddy investigation gameplay, there's plenty of fun (and wrong guessing) to be had."
