= Steer Madness =

2004 video game

- Developer: Johnathan Skinner
- Publisher: Johnathan Skinner
- Designer: Johnathan Skinner
- Platforms: Microsoft Windows, Macintosh, Android, iOS
- Release: Original version: December 2004, Remake: April 2023
- Genre: Adventure
- Mode: Single-player

Steer Madness is an animal rights inspired adventure game developed and published by Johnathan Skinner, with the latest version released on April 24, 2023 for mobile and desktop. The original version of the game was developed under the name Veggie Games Inc. and was released in December 2004. It joined the ranks of games made by PETA, Greenpeace, and others.

== Gameplay ==
Steer Madness is a single-player video game where the player assumes the role of Bryce the Cow, a walking, talking bovine determined to put an end to animal exploitation and turn everyone vegan. During gameplay, the player goes on a series of missions to save the animals using many different tactics. The game is a 3D side-scroller based in a modern city environment and features several transportation methods. Players have the option to walk, use a bicycle, or take the metro through the city to get to different areas of the game. Missions involve many gameplay elements, including puzzle solving and item collection.

=== Original Version ===
The original version of the game from 2004 was similar in theme but differed in gameplay style; it was based in an open city environment with gameplay similar to Grand Theft Auto III (without the guns or violence), making it a nonviolent video game. Players could drive a vehicle in select missions, and could also climb, jump, race and operate heavy machinery.

== Development ==
The latest version of Steer Madness was developed in London, UK. The majority of the game was made by just one person, solo independent game developer Johnathan Skinner. This includes all of the programming (which was done from scratch), story, design and a significant portion of the artwork. It was noted that the game development was powered exclusively on solar power while working off-grid aboard a narrowboat. The game has been published for mobile on Google Play and the App Store, and for desktop on Steam.

=== Original Version ===
The original version of Steer Madness was also developed by Johnathan Skinner but in Vancouver, BC, Canada under the company name Veggie Games Inc. Also developed primarily solo, he worked on the game in his spare time for about a year and a half while working other jobs, then decided to focus all his time into finishing and publishing the game. He registered the company, rented a small office and hired an artist to help. After about 6 months of full-time development and the help of a few student interns, the game was complete and ready for release. Skinner, when interviewed by The Globe and Mail, hoped that the game would "sway a few people." He later said he ran the game on a shoestring budget, funding Veggie Games "with a Visa card."

Taking the self-publishing route, game CDs were printed in small batches and sold through the website. Various animal rights groups in Canada, the United States, United Kingdom and Germany purchased wholesale quantities in order to resell the game CDs through their online stores as a form of fundraising, while it was also presented at the 2004 Electronic Entertainment Expo in Los Angeles.

== Awards ==
Steer Madness received two awards shortly after the 2004 release. The first award was Best Animal-Friendly Video Game from the 2004 PETA Proggy Awards, and the second was Innovation in Audio from the 2005 Independent Games Festival.

== Reception ==
Some scholars described it as an example of "an activism game" and said it aligns with "mass-market entertainment game genres." Others recommended it to "animal conscious parents" and said it encourages veganism.
