= Soul Fjord =

2014 video game

- Developer: Airtight Games
- Director: Kim Swift
- Platform: Ouya
- Release: January 28, 2014
- Genres: Roguelite, rhythm

Soul Fjord is a 2014 hybrid roguelike rhythm game developed by Airtight Games for the Ouya games console. The game is designed to be a mixture of Norse mythology and 1970s funk, and this is reflected in the visuals and sound which blend elements of the two.

== Plot ==
After perishing in combat, "funk warrior" Magnus Jones ascends to Club Valhalla atop the tree of life, Yggdrasil. Expecting a warm reception, he is taken off-guard when the bouncer takes exception to him, and knocks him down to the foot of the tree. Magnus must return to the club entrance and defeat the doorman to claim his rightful place in the afterlife.

== Gameplay ==
The game consists of nine procedurally-generated levels that the player must clear without dying in order to complete the game. Each level is made of a series of interconnecting rooms filled with enemies, the doors to which are locked until all the enemies are defeated.

Magnus may attack his enemies with light or heavy attacks, performing more damage and gaining access to weapon-specific combos by attacking in time with the music. A visual metronome beneath Magnus helps keep rhythm. Enemies and chests drop equipment in the form of new weapons and armor to replace your existing ones.

Upon death, all equipment is lost, with the exception of items which are "Soul-Bound", which can be carried over an unlimited number of times. Items can be soul bound at the expense of platinum records, which are dropped by boss enemies and can also be bought as the game's main free-to-play element.

== Reception ==
Reception

Review scores
Publication	Score
Destructoid	4/10
ScrewAttack	7/10

Soul Fjord was initially announced in early 2013, and met with high levels of anticipation as one of the first exclusives announced for the console.

Upon release, the game received mixed reviews. Critics praised the visual design and originality of the game, while many felt that the combat didn't mesh well with the music.
