= Steve Rabin =

American video game programmer

Steve Rabin is an American software engineer, college instructor, and editor/author who specializes in the field of video game artificial intelligence. He is best known as the chief editor of the AI Game Programming Wisdom series of books and as an author in the Game Programming Gems series of books. Rabin is currently a principal software engineer at Nintendo of America and an instructor at both the DigiPen Institute of Technology and the University of Washington Extension.

== AI Game Programming Wisdom series ==
Rabin has had a significant impact on the field of game AI by driving the AI Game Programming Wisdom series. With 246 articles from industry experts contained in the four volumes, this source of information on techniques and algorithms from commercial games has dwarfed other sources of game AI information, such as the Game Developers Conference which typically features fewer than half a dozen game AI presentations each year. As such, this has allowed implementation details about a great deal of groundbreaking AI to be widely known, such as empathy learning in Black & White by Richard Evans, planning in F.E.A.R. by Jeff Orkin, and agent reputation systems in Fable by Adam Russell. By leading the effort to publish commercial game AI techniques, Rabin has become a top figure in the field of game AI.

== Game credits ==
- HyperBlade (1996), AI programmer
- Microsoft Baseball 3D 1998 Edition (1998), AI programmer
- Dungeon Siege (2002), AI programmer
