= NRA Gun Club =

2006 video game

- Developer: Jarhead Games
- Publishers: NA: Crave Entertainment; ITA: 505 Games
- Platform: PlayStation 2
- Release: October 2, 2006
- Genre: First-person shooter
- Modes: Single-player, multiplayer

NRA Gun Club (Gun Club in Italy) is described as a nonviolent first-person target shooting game by Crave Entertainment in North America and 505 Games only in Italy. Although not released in the UK, a few PAL UK units have been found in circulation in some 505 European markets (A German release was planned, but cancelled for unknown reasons). The game allows gamers to enter the shooting range and shoot at paper targets, watermelons and sporting clays. The game contains over 100 licensed and recreated firearms. It was endorsed by the National Rifle Association of America, bearing their logo on the cover art.

== Background ==
Gun Club was one of a number of target shooting games backed by the NRA in response to the perception that violent first-person shooters were responsible for violent crime including school shootings. In 2012, NRA President Wayne LaPierre lambasted video games in a press conference following the Sandy Hook Elementary School shooting stating "Another little dirty secret the media tries to conceal is a callous corrupt and disgusting shadow industry ... vicious violent video games,"

Weeks later, the NRA released "NRA: Practice Range" - a mobile game for Apple iOS devices.

At the time of release, the NRA commented on Gun Club that "In keeping with the NRA mission, this game tests marksmanship in a sporting environment and emphasizes responsible use of firearms,".

Alongside Gun Club on PS2, NRA High Power Competition was released for Windows PCs in 2006.

== Reception ==
The game received very poor ratings and reviews. It was rated by GameSpot 1.6 out of 10 (abysmal) as one of the worst games ever made for the PlayStation 2. Another gaming site, IGN, gave the game a 1.5 out of 10 ("abysmal") and called the game, "a bold move in exploring new depths of sheer worthlessness." The game was rated E10+ (for everyone 10 years of age or older) for mild violence by the Entertainment Software Rating Board.

Particular criticism was directed at the poor quality of graphics and the generic audio, with sounds used across "over 100 licensed and faithfully recreated firearms.". Reviewers noted that in a firearm-oriented game, failure to differentiate guns in gameplay rendered much of the progression pointless.
