= Kim Swift =

American video game designer

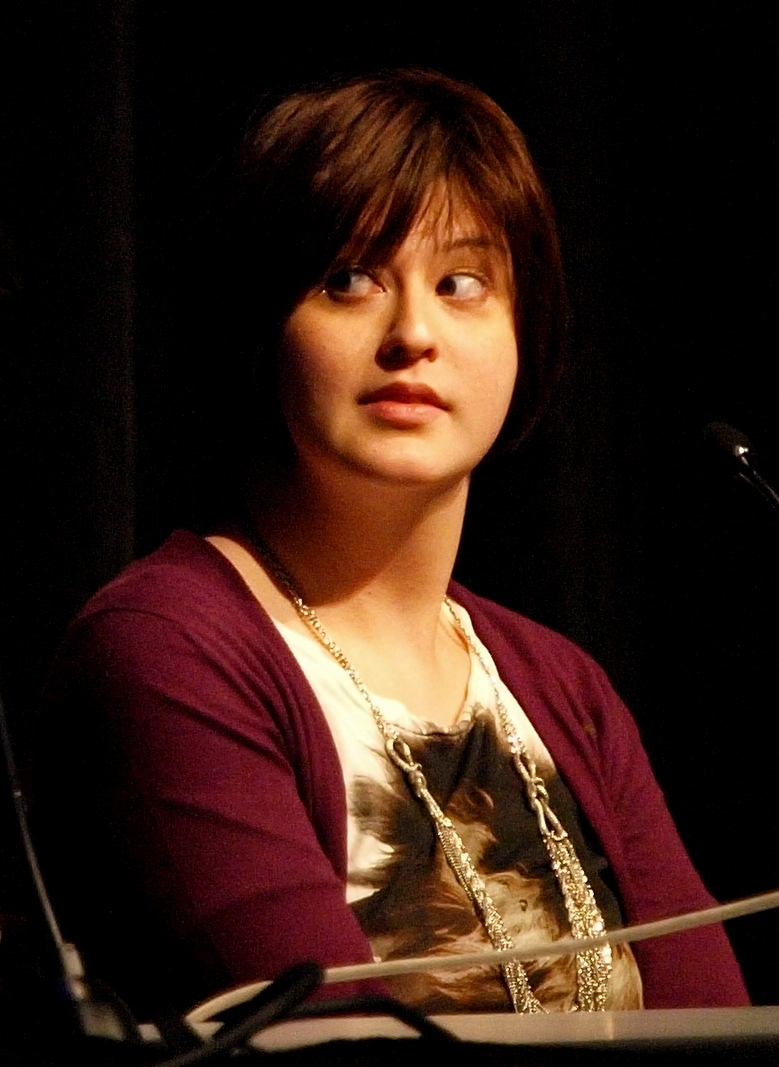
- Swift at the 2010 Game Developers Conference
- Born: Kimberly Swift; 1982 or 1983 (age 42–43)
- Occupation: Video game designer

Kimberly Swift (born 1982 or 1983) is an American video game designer best known for her work at Valve with games such as Portal and Left 4 Dead. Swift was featured by Fortune as one of "30 Under 30" influential figures in the video game industry. She was described in Mental Floss as one of the most recognized women in the industry and by Wired as "an artist that will push the medium forward".

== Career ==
A graduate of DigiPen, Kim Swift and a group of her fellow graduates developed Narbacular Drop, a portal-based game that was later presented to Valve, which led to Gabe Newell personally offering to hire them so that they could create the critically acclaimed game Portal. Kim Swift was the leader of the Portal team as well as a level designer. She was credited along with writer Erik Wolpaw in Portal's Game Developers Choice Awards for design, innovation, and game of the year.

Besides Portal, Swift has been involved in other Valve projects, most notably Left 4 Dead and its sequel, Left 4 Dead 2, where she also played a leading role in development.

In December 2009, Swift left Valve to join Airtight Games. There, in cooperation with Square Enix, she led the team that developed Quantum Conundrum, which released in 2012. In a 2012, in an interview with Wired, Swift expressed the opinion that the most important impact of video games is that they are "a socially acceptable way for adults to imagine".

Amazon announced in April 2014 that they had brought Swift in to help build games in their internal studio. Swift described her role as senior designer for as yet undisclosed projects. In January 2017, Electronic Arts announced they have hired Swift as a design director within their Motive Studios, who developed Star Wars Battlefront II.

Swift had been part of the Google Stadia internal development studio, Stadia Games & Entertainment, as a game design director, until Google closed down the studio in February 2021. By June 2021, Swift had been hired by Xbox Game Studios Publishing as the senior director of cloud gaming. Swift hosted the 20th Game Developers Choice Awards ceremony on March 18, 2020. She joined NEARstudios as chief operating officer in 2025.

== Games ==
- Narbacular Drop (2005)
- Half-Life 2: Episode One (2006)
- Portal (2007)
- Half-Life 2: Episode Two (2007)
- Portal: Still Alive (2008)
- Left 4 Dead (2008)
- Left 4 Dead 2 (2009)
- Quantum Conundrum (2012)
- PIXLD (2012)
- Soul Fjord (2014)
- Star Wars Battlefront II (2017)
