= Airtight Games =

Former American independent video game developer

- Industry: Video games
- Founded: 2004
- Defunct: July 2014
- Headquarters: Redmond, Washington, United States,
- Key people: Jim Deal (president)

Airtight Games was an American independent video game developer based in Redmond founded in 2004. It was made up of former members of FASA Studio, Will Vinton Studios and Microsoft, as well as several other studios, with key members included president and creative director Jim Deal, art director Matt Brunner, and co-founder Ed Fries.

== History ==
Airtight Games was formed in 2004 by the core team that shipped the Xbox title Crimson Skies: High Road to Revenge. Their first title was the 2010 action game Dark Void, published by Capcom and released for Microsoft Windows, PlayStation 3 and Xbox 360 platforms.

In 2012 they released a puzzle-platform game with Square Enix as publisher, titled Quantum Conundrum. They followed this up with two mobile games for iOS in 2012 and 2013, and Soul Fjord, a hybrid roguelike/rhythm game developed as an exclusive title for the short-lived Ouya console and released in 2014.

In June 2014 they released the adventure-mystery game Murdered: Soul Suspect, published by Square Enix and released for Microsoft Windows, PlayStation 3, PlayStation 4, Xbox 360 and Xbox One. Earlier that year the studio had laid off 14 employees, and its creative director Kim Swift joining Amazon Game Studios. A month later Airtight Games closed in July 2014.

== Games developed ==
Year	Title	Publisher	Platform(s)						
Year	Title	Publisher	Ouya	iOS	PS3	Win	X360	PS4	XBO
2010	Dark Void	Capcom	No	No	Yes	Yes	Yes	No	No
2012	Quantum Conundrum	Square Enix	No	No	Yes	Yes	Yes	No	No
2012	Pixld	Airtight Games	No	Yes	No	No	No	No	No
2013	DerpBike	Airtight Games	No	Yes	No	No	No	No	No
2014	Soul Fjord	Airtight Games	Yes	No	No	No	No	No	No
2014	Murdered: Soul Suspect	Square Enix	No	No	Yes	Yes	Yes	Yes	Yes
