= Seiklus =

2003 video game

- Publisher(s): Independent
- Designer(s): cly5m
- Engine: GameMaker
- Platform(s): Windows, Mac OS X
- Release: 2003
- Genre(s): Platform game
- Mode(s): Single-player

Seiklus (Estonian for adventure) is a platform game for Microsoft Windows. It was created by cly5m, using GameMaker over a period of approximately 6 months.

== Overview ==
Seiklus is a puzzle platform game made with GameMaker with an emphasis on exploration. There is no dialogue or literary exposition of the plot. The game consists of various different, loosely connected areas the player has to explore, collecting both items to help on the way and floating "wisps" of various colours; obtaining a 100% collection rate on all levels will unlock the bonus level which is needed to view the ending and credits. Seiklus has no weapons and no violence. There are various "hostile" lifeforms in some areas, but at worst they only set the player back a little. It is impossible to die or get stuck.

The game has a chiptune soundtrack.
