= DigiPen Institute of Technology =

University in the United States

- Type: Private for-profit university
- Established: 1988
- Accreditation: ACCSC
- President: Claude Comair
- Undergraduates: 2500+
- Postgraduates: 50+
- Location: Redmond, Washington; 47°41′20″N 122°9′2″W; Singapore; 1°18′28″N 103°46′41″E; Bilbao, Spain; 43°16′18″N 2°57′51″W
- Campus: Suburban
- Colors: Black & maroon
- Nickname: Dragons
- Website: www.digipen.edu

DigiPen Institute of Technology is a private for-profit university in Redmond, Washington. It also has campuses in Singapore and Bilbao, Spain. DigiPen offers bachelors' and masters' degree programs in computer science, game design, digital art and animation, and audio programming and design.

== History ==
In 1988, DigiPen was founded by Claude Comair in Vancouver, British Columbia, Canada as a research and development institute for computer science and animation. Comair continues to be the president and CEO to the present day.

In the early 1990s, DigiPen began offering its first dedicated educational program in the subject of 3D computer animation through the Vancouver Film School. Around the same time, DigiPen started a collaboration with Nintendo of America to create a post-secondary program for video game programming. Through this collaborative effort with Nintendo, the DigiPen Applied Computer Graphics School accepted its first class of video game programming students in 1994.

In 1996, the Washington State Higher Education Coordinating Board granted DigiPen the authorization to award degrees in the United States. DigiPen's first degree program, the Bachelor of Science in Computer Science in Real-Time Interactive Simulation, became the world's first bachelor's degree in video game development.

In 1998, DigiPen Institute of Technology opened its campus in Redmond, Washington as a joint campus between DigiPen and Nintendo Software Technology.

In 2002, DigiPen received national accreditation from the ACCSC. DigiPen began offering its first Master's program, a Master of Science in Computer Science. DigiPen graduated the last cohorts in its associate programs, focusing instead on undergraduate and postgraduate programs.

In 2008, DigiPen Institute of Technology opened its campus in Singapore in conjunction with Singapore's Economic Development Board.

In 2010, DigiPen relocated its main campus to an independent location, still in Redmond, Washington. DigiPen Institute of Technology Singapore joined the Singapore Institute of Technology (SIT).

In 2011, DigiPen Institute of Technology opened its campus in the Greater Bilbao area, in the municipality of Zierbena.

In 2015, DigiPen's Singapore campus moved to the Singapore Polytechnic campus, while Singapore Institute of Technology's joint campus began development.

In 2024, DigiPen's Singapore campus received approval from ACCSC on the change of location to the Singapore Institute of Technology Punggol Campus as part of the educational partnership with SIT.

In 2025, DigiPen introduced an institutional policy providing a process for transferring the intellectual property rights of student-created projects from DigiPen to students and alumni, allowing them to monetize their work both in and out of college.

== Campuses ==
=== Redmond, Washington, United States ===
DigiPen's main campus is located in Redmond, Washington, and it offers a range of undergraduate and graduate degree programs. It has a relatively small student body, with low student-to-faculty ratios and small average class sizes. There are numerous student-run organizations on campus.

=== Singapore ===
DigiPen opened its Singapore campus in conjunction with Singapore's Economic Development Board in 2008. DigiPen's Singapore campus arranges courses for Singapore Institute of Technology students, and does not enroll students directly or issue undergraduate certificates independently. DigiPen's Singapore campus offers three undergraduate degree programs.

=== Bilbao, Spain ===
DigiPen's Europe campus is located in Ribera de Zorrotzaurre, 2 in the city of Bilbao. It offers two undergraduate degree programs.

=== International university partnerships ===
- Keimyung University in Daegu, South Korea and DigiPen Institute of Technology have a collaboration where students local to South Korea have the option to spend a program's first 5 semesters in Daegu, taught by DigiPen Faculty members, and the remaining semesters in Redmond.
- King Mongkut's University of Technology Thonburi in Bangkok, Thailand and DigiPen Institute of Technology have a collaboration where students enter one of two programs with courses that map with DigiPen's BFA in Digital Art and Animation and BA in Game Design programs.
- DigiPen Institute of Technology launched a training program in Saudi Arabia to equip citizens with skills in game development using the Unity engine.
- Collège Notre-Dame de Jamhour in Jamhour, Lebanon and DigiPen Institute of Technology have collaborated through workshops focused on computer science and video game development.

== Accreditation ==
DigiPen is accredited by the Accrediting Commission of Career Schools and Colleges (ACCSC). DigiPen's Bachelor of Science in Computer Science in Real-Time Interactive Simulation is also accredited by ABET.

== Research and development ==
DigiPen Research & Development is active in the research in Formula 1 and INDYCAR, and is technical sponsor of Renault F1 (2008–present) and Andretti Autosport (2015–present).

DigiPen's Research & Development arm created an artificial intelligence system regarding human behavioral modeling and simulation, titled B-HIVE, for Boeing and their Phantom Works division. B-HIVE and its associated patents were commended as Boeing's "Supplier Technology of the Year" in 2008.

== Connection to Portal ==
DigiPen Institute of Technology played a key role in the development of Valve's Portal series through its student game team projects and alumni. In 2005, a team of DigiPen students created Narbacular Drop, a 3D puzzle game featuring a portal-based mechanic. The project gained attention from representatives of Valve for its innovative gameplay at the school's annual reverse career fair. Valve recruited the student team members, including designer Kim Swift, to develop Portal using Narbacular Drop's mechanics. Similarly in 2008, Valve representatives visited DigiPen's reverse career fair and played the student game Tag: The Power of Paint. Valve hired the team to implement many of the game's mechanics into Portal 2.

== Criticism ==
- In a 2021 video entitled "DigiPen: The College That Teaches Crunch Culture", gaming journalist and YouTuber James Stephanie Sterling, citing a series of anonymous interviews they had conducted with former DigiPen students, accused the school of conditioning students into the crunch culture of the larger video game industry.

== Notable faculty ==
- Ellen Beeman – fantasy and science fiction author, television screenwriter, and computer game designer/producer Beeman is an Associate Professor of Game Software Design and Production at DigiPen.
- Steve Rabin – former software engineer at Nintendo and editor/author who specializes in the field of video game artificial intelligence. Rabin is an Adjunct University Lecturer of Computer Science at DigiPen.
- Jeremy Holcomb - game designer and writer. Holcomb is the Program Director of the BA in Game Design degree program.
- Brian Schmidt - music composer for video games and pinball machines. Schmidt is an Adjunct Professor of Music at DigiPen.
- Mark Henne – artist and former technical director at Pixar working on animated films Toy Story and The Incredibles. Henne is the Program Director of the MFA in Digital Arts degree program.

== Notable alumni ==
- Kim Swift – designer on the Portal team
- Nate Martin – "Founding Father of Escape Rooms", co-founder and CEO of Puzzle Break
- Aubrey Edwards – video game developer and professional wrestling referee
- Howard Wang – voice actor
- Ike Nwala - television personality
- Nick Kondo – Lead animator on Spider-Man: Into the Spider-Verse, Spider-Man: Across the Spider-Verse, and The Mitchells Vs. The Machines
- Alex Williams – CTO of ARK franchise developer Studio Wildcard
- Satomi Asakawa – Nintendo NPC designer and animator on The Legend of Zelda series (1998 – 2011), Pikmin, Super Mario Sunshine and Animal Crossing: New Leaf
- Evan Alderete – Composer for The Amazing Digital Circus and Hazbin Hotel
- Logan Fieth – Designer on indie puzzle game Superliminal.
- Adam Brennecke – Grounded game director at Obsidian Entertainment

== Notable student games ==
- Dig-N-Rig
- Narbacular Drop
- Tag: The Power of Paint
- Perspective
- FPS Chess
