= Narbacular Drop =

2005 video game

- Developer: Nuclear Monkey Software
- Publisher: DigiPen Institute of Technology
- Director: Jeep Barnett
- Producer: Kim Swift
- Designer: Garret Rickey
- Programmer: Dave Kircher
- Artist: Scott Klintworth
- Composers: Joshua Billeaudeau; Jeep Barnett
- Platform: Windows
- Release: April 19, 2005
- Genre: Puzzle-platform game
- Mode: Single-player

Narbacular Drop is a 2005 puzzle-platform game developed by Nuclear Monkey Software. It was the senior game project of students attending DigiPen Institute of Technology. The gameplay consists of navigating a dungeon using an innovative portal system. The player controls two interconnected portals that can be placed on any non-metallic surface (wall, ceiling, or floor). Gabe Newell, managing director of Valve, took interest in the team's work and employed the whole staff at Valve. The developers went on to develop the critically acclaimed Portal using many of the same concepts.

The word Narbacular, which does not exist in any dictionary, was chosen primarily to aid in internet search engine results.

== Gameplay ==
Screenshot of gameplay from the first playable build of the game

While Narbacular Drop features a 3D world reminiscent of such first-person shooters as Quake, the unique portal element and the character's lack of a jump ability makes navigation and puzzle-solving very unconventional. The player can open a single pair of interconnected portals at a time, each styled as a huge face with flaming eyes (orange or blue to tell them apart as the player repositions one or the other) and an open mouth big enough to see and walk through. Positioned with a point-and-click interface controlled by the mouse, portals are allowed only on natural surfaces and are prohibited from any metal, lava or other artificial surfaces in the game. Aside from the portals, important game elements include switches, boxes, huge rolling boulders which can crush the character, and "lava turtles" that help the player traverse stretches of magma. The player cannot save game progress. Because of the lack of a save feature, the game is actually quite short, comprising only six levels (including an unfinished boss level) and a bonus "showroom" exhibiting the game's art assets alongside unused material.

Being mostly a proof of applied concept, the game contains only six puzzles to solve, but members of the Narbacular Drop forum community have created a catalog of custom maps.

== Plot ==
The plot involves the plight of a Princess "No-Knees", so named because she is unable to jump. Captured by a demon, the imprisoned princess discovers that the dungeon she is held in is actually a sentient elemental creature named Wally. Using Wally's portal-making ability, the princess sets out to escape and defeat the demon.

== Awards and honors ==
- IGF Student Showcase Winner (2006)
- Slamdance Guerrilla Gamemaker Competition Finalist (2006)
- GameShadow Innovation In Games Festival & Awards Nomination (2006)
- Game Informer The Top 10 Games You've Never Heard Of
- Edge Internet Game of The Month (March 2006)
- Gamasutra Quantum Leap Awards: Most Important Games "Honorable Mention" (2006)

== Portal ==
Valve, developers of the Half-Life series, became interested in Narbacular Drop after seeing the game at DigiPen's annual career fair. Robin Walker, one of Valve's developers, saw the game at the fair and later contacted the team, providing them with advice and offering to show their game at Valve's offices. After their presentation, Valve president Gabe Newell offered the entire team jobs at Valve to develop the game further. The team developed Portal in approximately two years and four months after joining Valve.

In Portal, the player-controlled silent protagonist, Chell, is challenged and taunted by an artificial intelligence named GLaDOS to complete each puzzle in the Aperture Science Enrichment Center. The player must solve puzzles using "the Aperture Science Handheld Portal Device", a device that can create portals between two flat planes. Certain elements have been retained from Narbacular Drop, such as the system of identifying the two unique portal endpoints with the colors orange and blue. Portal was released on October 10, 2007, on PC, Xbox 360 and PlayStation 3, as part of The Orange Box, to critical and commercial success. A sequel, Portal 2, was released on April 19, 2011.
