= 1 Second Everyday =

Mobile video application

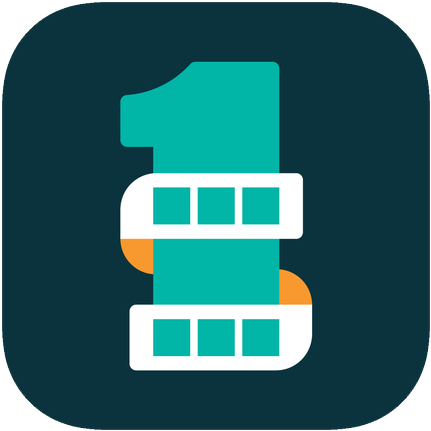
- Developer: 1 Second Everyday Inc.
- Release: 10 January 2013; 13 years ago
Stable release
- Android: 4.2.3 / 27 January 2023; 3 years ago
- iOS: 4.7.8 / 22 February 2023; 3 years ago
- Written in: Swift, Objective-C
- Platform: iOS 14.1 or later Android 7 or later
- Available in: iOS: English, Spanish
- Website: 1se.co

1 Second Everyday (1SE) is an application developed by Cesar Kuriyama. The application allows the user to record one second of video every day and then chronologically edits (mashes) them together into a single film. It is compatible with iOS and Android. The idea of the application was developed by Kuriyama's 1 Second Everyday — Age 30 video.

The application was launched in January 2013. 1 Second Everyday played a part in the plot of Chef and also became the inspiration for the 2014 short animated clip Feast.

== Background ==
=== Kuriyama's video ===
In February 2011, when Cesar Kuriyama turned 30, after saving money, he quit his job in an advertising firm and took a year off to travel. During this time, he started working on a project he called 1 Second Everyday. As part of the project, every day he recorded one second of video – something that was supposed to help him remember that day. He started the project because he was frustrated with his memory. He planned to stockpile the 365 one-second clips into one film to serve as a memento of his year. While working on the project Kuriyama realized that recording one second every day impacted the decisions he made in a positive way.

After a year he made a 365-second clip out of his recordings. The video called 1 Second Everyday – Age 30, went viral.

According to Kuriyama, he was initially inspired to take a year off from work by a TED talk given by Stefan Sagmeister called "The Power of Time Off." Kuriyama also delivered a TED talk about 1 Second Everyday in 2012 at TED 2012 in Long Beach California.

=== Kickstarter campaign ===
After completing his own video, Kuriyama decided to develop an application that would allow the users to record one second every day and compile their own videos. He developed a prototype of the application and then in 2012, he launched a Kickstarter campaign to raise funds for completing the application. The campaign became one of the most backed app campaigns in the history of Kickstarter. It was backed by 11,281 backers who pledged a total of $56,959 on an initial goal of $20,000.

Following the completion of the Kickstarter campaign, he partnered with an application design studio in Brooklyn to develop the application. 1 Second Everyday was released two weeks after the completion of its Kickstarter campaign.

== Application ==
The application was released for iOS on 10 January 2013. An Android-compatible version of the application was developed later. Using it, the user can record the videos in the application or they can select one second portions from their libraries. 1 Second Everyday dates every snippet. The user can also set alarms to remember to record their daily video. In order to compile a video, the user selects the seconds they want and the application creates a compilation video. The user can keep multiple timelines. It also allows users to post directly on social networks. The main interface in 1 Second Everyday is a calendar, which shows the user which days have snippets and which they can still fill in.

In the beginning, 1 Second Everyday restricted the recording to one second. However, the developers later released Super Seconds, which allowed users to record an additional half a second video. In 2014, 1 Second Everyday Crowds was launched, which is an area in the application featuring compilations of second clips from different users.

== In the media ==
The Kickstarter campaign of 1 Second Everyday was featured in Entrepreneur's 3 Innovative Tech Startups on Kickstarter Right Now in 2012. The application was featured in The New York Times, The Washington Post, Gawker and other media outlets. By the end of the launch day, it was in Top 10 Free Apps on App Store. It was also selected as the App of the Week on GeekWire in 2013.

Several other one-second compilation videos were also posted on the Internet after Kuriyama's video gained media attention. Sam Cornwell, an English photographer documented his son Indigo's growth using a montage of one-second iPhone clips. He shot these clips every single day from the moment of birth right up to the baby's first birthday. According to Cornwell, he was inspired by Kuriyama's project. The video of Cornwell's son gained considerable media attention after it was posted on YouTube. Save the Children also made a video commercial based on a similar format that showed a British girl oblivious of the Syrian war end up being a refugee.

1SE was a finalist for the Fast Company Innovation by Design Award in 2015, but lost to Google Maps. In 2015, Google Android created a gallery, Leap Second 2015, with the help of Droga5 and Kuriyama. The gallery showcased how people around the world enjoyed the one extra second of their lives. Through the 1 Second Everyday app available at Google Play, people were able to submit their extra second, which were then vetted and added to the gallery. The viewers were able to view other celebratory seconds from around the world as well as searching for them using different hashtags.
