= Shades of green =

Varieties of the color green

Green

Spectral coordinates
- Wavelength: 520–570 nm
- Frequency: ≈526–577 THz

Common connotations
- nature, environmentally friendly, St. Patrick's Day, Earth Day, Christmas, money, Earth, spring, health

Color coordinates
- Hex triplet: #00FF00
- sRGB^{B} (r, g, b): (0, 255, 0)
- HSV (h, s, v): (120°, 100%, 100%)
- CIELCh_{uv} (L, C, h): (88, 136, 128°)
- Source: RGB color system
- B: Normalized to [0–255] (byte); H: Normalized to [0–100] (hundred)
- Some tints and shades of green

Varieties of the color green may differ in hue, chroma (also called saturation or intensity) or lightness (or value, tone, or brightness), or in two or three of these qualities. Variations in value are also called tints and shades, a tint being a green or other hue mixed with white, a shade being mixed with black. A large selection of these various colors is shown below.

== Core definitions of green ==
=== Green (sRGB) ===
Green (sRGB)

Color coordinates
- Hex triplet: #00FF00
- sRGB^{B} (r, g, b): (0, 255, 0)
- HSV (h, s, v): (120°, 100%, 100%)
- CIELCh_{uv} (L, C, h): (88, 136, 128°)
- Source: X11 color names, HTML/CSS
- ISCC–NBS descriptor: Vivid yellowish green
- B: Normalized to [0–255] (byte)

The color defined as green in the sRGB color space is approximately the most chromatic green that can be reproduced on an average computer screen, and is the color named green in X11. It is one of the three primary colors used in the sRGB color space along with red and blue. The three additive primaries in the RGB color system are the three colors of light chosen such as to provide the maximum range of colors that are capable of being represented on a computer or television set.

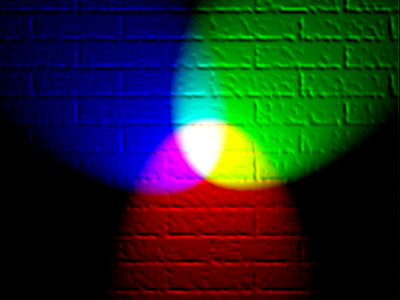
Red, green and blue lights, representing the three basic additive primary colors of the RGB color system, red, green, and blue.

This color is also called regular green. It is at precisely 120 degrees on the HSV color wheel. Its complementary color is magenta.

HTML/CSS uses the name lime for this color, using green to refer to a darker shade. See the chart Color names that clash between X11 and HTML/CSS in the X11 color names article to see those colors which are different in HTML and X11.

=== Green (HTML/CSS color) (Office Green) ===
Green (HTML/CSS color) (Office Green)

Color coordinates
- Hex triplet: #008000
- sRGB^{B} (r, g, b): (0, 128, 0)
- HSV (h, s, v): (120°, 100%, 50%)
- CIELCh_{uv} (L, C, h): (46, 72, 128°)
- Source: HTML/CSS
- ISCC–NBS descriptor: Deep yellowish green
- B: Normalized to [0–255] (byte)

The color defined as green in HTML/CSS color standard is the color called green, low green, or medium green in many of the older eight-bit computer palettes.

Another name for this color is green W3C or office green.

=== Green (CMYK) (pigment green) ===
Green (CMYK) (pigment green)
- Cyan, magenta, and yellow are the three subtractive primary colors used in printing.

Color coordinates
- Hex triplet: #00A550
- sRGB^{B} (r, g, b): (0, 165, 80)
- HSV (h, s, v): (149°, 100%, 65%)
- CIELCh_{uv} (L, C, h): (59, 74, 137°)
- Source: CMYK
- ISCC–NBS descriptor: Vivid yellowish green
- B: Normalized to [0–255] (byte)

The color defined as green in the CMYK color system used in printing, also known as pigment green, is the tone of green that is achieved by mixing process (printer's) cyan and process (printer's) yellow in equal proportions.

The purpose of the CMYK color system is to provide the maximum possible gamut of color reproducible in printing.

The color indicated is only approximate as the colors of printing inks may vary. The color displayed is an approximation of the CMYK color on an RGB screen, and cannot replicate the color accurately.

=== Green (NCS) (psychological primary green) ===
Green (NCS)
- Approximations within the sRGB gamut to the primary colors of the Natural Color System, a model based on the opponent process theory of color vision.

Color coordinates
- Hex triplet: #009F6B
- sRGB^{B} (r, g, b): (0, 159, 107)
- HSV (h, s, v): (160°, 100%, 62%)
- CIELCh_{uv} (L, C, h): (58, 58, 148°)
- Source: sRGB approximation to NCS 2060-G
- ISCC–NBS descriptor: Strong yellowish green
- B: Normalized to [0–255] (byte)

The color defined as green in the NCS or Natural Color System is NCS 2060-G. The natural color system is a color system based on the four unique hues or psychological primary colors red, yellow, green, and blue. The NCS is based on the opponent process theory of vision. The Natural Color System is widely used in Scandinavia.

=== Green (Munsell) ===
Green (Munsell)
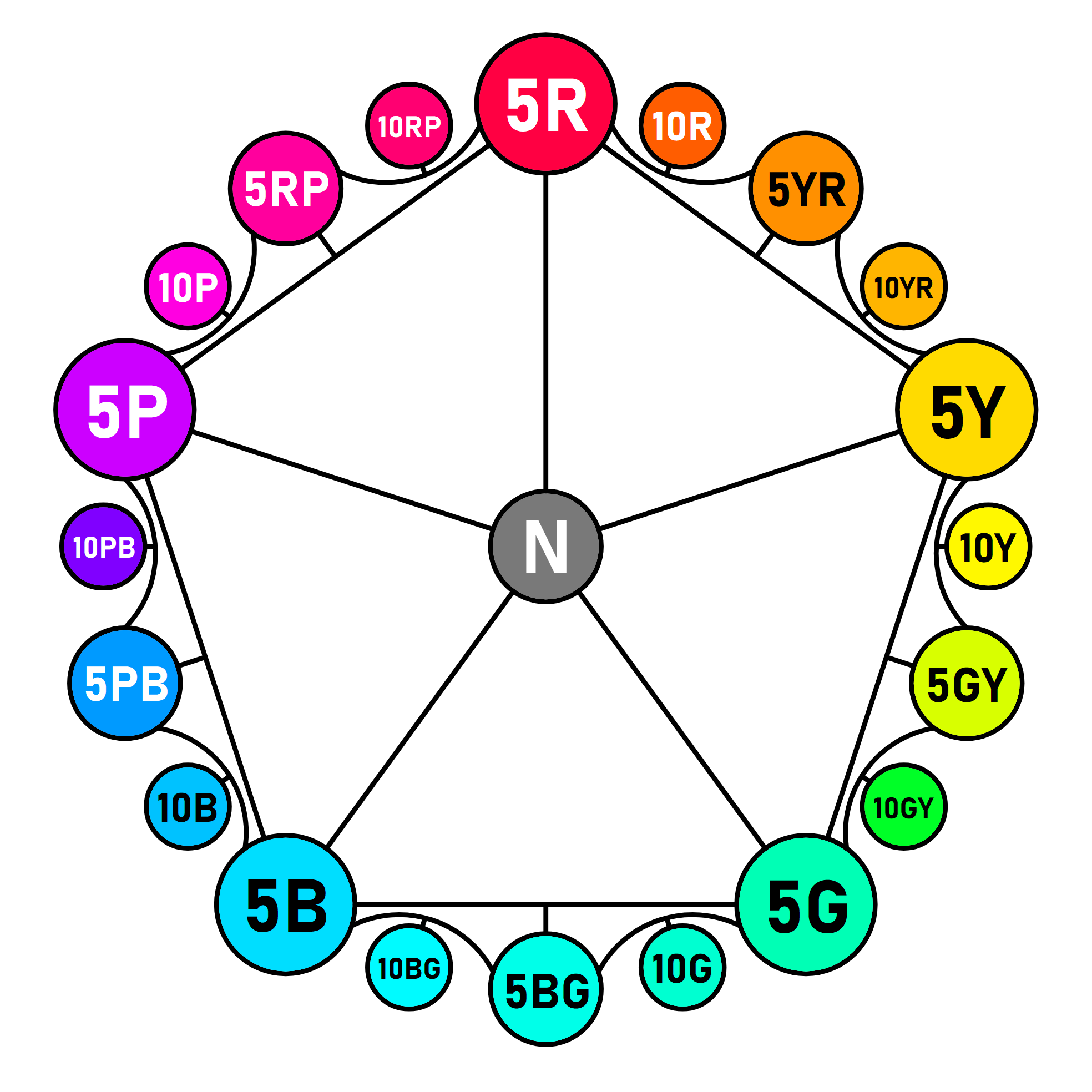
- The hues of the Munsell color system, at varying values, and maximum chroma to stay in the sRGB gamut

Color coordinates
- Hex triplet: #00FFB5
- sRGB^{B} (r, g, b): (0, 255, 181)
- HSV (h, s, v): (163°, 100%, 100%)
- CIELCh_{uv} (L, C, h): (89, 87, 151°)
- Source: https://pteromys.melonisland.net/munsell/
- ISCC–NBS descriptor: Brilliant green
- B: Normalized to [0–255] (byte)

The Munsell color system is a color space that specifies colors based on three color dimensions: hue, value (lightness), and chroma (colorfulness), spaced uniformly (in terms of human perception) in three dimensions in the Munsell color solid. In order for all the colors to be spaced uniformly, it was found necessary to use a color wheel with five, non-arbitrary, equally spaced primary colors: red, yellow, green, blue, and purple.

The color of the sample is the most chromatic (colorful) green in the sRGB gamut that falls in the hue of 5G (primary green) in the Munsell color space. Munsell identified green as the "color of ordinary foliage" with a wavelength between 0.511 and 0.543 micron.

=== Green (Pantone) ===
Green (Pantone)

Color coordinates
- Hex triplet: #00AD83
- sRGB^{B} (r, g, b): (0, 173, 131)
- HSV (h, s, v): (165°, 100%, 68%)
- CIELCh_{uv} (L, C, h): (63, 58, 157°)
- Source: Pantone TPX
- ISCC–NBS descriptor: Brilliant green
- B: Normalized to [0–255] (byte)

Green (Pantone) is the color that is called green in Pantone.

The source of this color is the "Pantone Textile Paper eXtended (TPX)" color list, color # green C, EC, HC, PC, U, or UP—green.

=== Green (Crayola) ===
Green (Crayola)

Color coordinates
- Hex triplet: #01A368
- sRGB^{B} (r, g, b): (1, 163, 104)
- HSV (h, s, v): (158°, 99%, 64%)
- CIELCh_{uv} (L, C, h): (59, 62, 146°)
- Source: Crayola colorxs.com
- ISCC–NBS descriptor: Strong yellowish green
- B: Normalized to [0–255] (byte)

Green (Crayola) is the color called green in Crayola crayons.

Green was one of the original Crayola crayons introduced in 1903.

== Additional computer web greens ==
=== Bright green ===
Bright green

Color coordinates
- Hex triplet: #66FF00
- sRGB^{B} (r, g, b): (102, 255, 0)
- HSV (h, s, v): (96°, 100%, 100%)
- CIELCh_{uv} (L, C, h): (89, 127, 123°)
- ISCC–NBS descriptor: Brilliant yellow green
- B: Normalized to [0–255] (byte)

Bright green is a vivid yellowish-green colour.

=== Dark green (X11) ===
Dark green (X11)

Color coordinates
- Hex triplet: #006400
- sRGB^{B} (r, g, b): (0, 100, 0)
- HSV (h, s, v): (120°, 100%, 39%)
- CIELCh_{uv} (L, C, h): (36, 56, 128°)
- Source: X11
- ISCC–NBS descriptor: Deep yellowish green
- B: Normalized to [0–255] (byte)

This is the X11/HTML color dark green.

=== Erin ===
Erin

Color coordinates
- Hex triplet: #00FF40
- sRGB^{B} (r, g, b): (0, 255, 64)
- HSV (h, s, v): (135°, 100%, 100%)
- CIELCh_{uv} (L, C, h): (88, 129, 130°)
- Source: Maerz and Paul
- ISCC–NBS descriptor: Vivid yellowish green
- B: Normalized to [0–255] (byte)

The first recorded use of Erin as a color name was in 1922.

=== Harlequin ===
Harlequin

Color coordinates
- Hex triplet: #40FF00
- sRGB^{B} (r, g, b): (64, 255, 0)
- HSV (h, s, v): (105°, 100%, 100%)
- CIELCh_{uv} (L, C, h): (88, 132, 126°)
- Source: Maerz and Paul
- ISCC–NBS descriptor: Vivid yellowish green
- B: Normalized to [0–255] (byte)

Harlequin is a color described as being located between green and yellow (closer to green than to yellow) on the color wheel. On color plate 17 in the 1930 book A Dictionary of Color (see reference below), the color harlequin is shown as being a highly saturated rich color at a position halfway between chartreuse and green. Thus in modern color terminology, harlequin is the color halfway between green and chartreuse green on the RGB color wheel.

The first recorded use of harlequin as a color name in English was in 1923.

Harlequin is a pure spectral color at approximately 552 nanometers on the visible spectrum when plotted on the CIE chromaticity diagram.

Harlequin is also an adjective used to describe something that is colored in a pattern, usually a diamond-shaped pattern, as in the dress traditionally associated with harlequins. Similarly, it can mean anything multicolored or prismatic, such as opals or other precious gems which are highly variegated in color and hue. In the early 2000s, a harlequin color paint was invented for automobiles that appears different colors from different angles of view.

=== Light green ===
Light green

Color coordinates
- Hex triplet: #90EE90
- sRGB^{B} (r, g, b): (144, 238, 144)
- HSV (h, s, v): (120°, 39%, 93%)
- CIELCh_{uv} (L, C, h): (87, 74, 128°)
- Source: X11
- ISCC–NBS descriptor: Brilliant yellowish green
- B: Normalized to [0–255] (byte)

Light green is a light tint of green.

=== Lime green (X11) ===
Lime green

Color coordinates
- Hex triplet: #32CD32
- sRGB^{B} (r, g, b): (50, 205, 50)
- HSV (h, s, v): (120°, 76%, 80%)
- CIELCh_{uv} (L, C, h): (73, 103, 128°)
- Source: X11
- ISCC–NBS descriptor: Vivid yellowish green
- B: Normalized to [0–255] (byte)

Lime green is a vivid, yellowish shade of green named after the lime fruit.

=== Neon green ===
Neon green

Color coordinates
- Hex triplet: #39FF14
- sRGB^{B} (r, g, b): (57, 255, 20)
- HSV (h, s, v): (111°, 92%, 100%)
- CIELCh_{uv} (L, C, h): (88, 132, 126°)
- Source: Layout Sparks
- ISCC–NBS descriptor: Vivid yellowish green
- B: Normalized to [0–255] (byte)

Neon green is a bright tone of green used in psychedelic art and in fashion. Neon green became a signature of English singer/songwriter Charli XCX with the release of her 2024 album Brat.

=== Pale green ===
Pale green

Color coordinates
- Hex triplet: #98FB98
- sRGB^{B} (r, g, b): (152, 251, 152)
- HSV (h, s, v): (120°, 39%, 98%)
- CIELCh_{uv} (L, C, h): (91, 78, 128°)
- Source: X11
- ISCC–NBS descriptor: Vivid yellowish green
- B: Normalized to [0–255] (byte)

This is the X11/HTML color pale green.

== Green in biological nature ==
Green is common in nature, especially in plants. Many plants are green mainly because of a complex chemical known as chlorophyll which is involved in photosynthesis. Many shades of green have been named after plants or are related to plants. Due to varying ratios of chlorophylls (and different amounts as well as other plant pigments being present), the plant kingdom exhibits many shades of green in both hue (true color) and value (lightness/darkness). The chlorophylls in living plants have distinctive green colors, while dried or cooked portions of plants are different shades of green due to the chlorophyll molecules losing their inner magnesium ion.

=== Acid green ===
Acid green

Color coordinates
- Hex triplet: #B0BF1A
- sRGB^{B} (r, g, b): (176, 191, 26)
- HSV (h, s, v): (65°, 86%, 75%)
- CIELCh_{uv} (L, C, h): (74, 80, 93°)
- Source: Art Paints YG07S
- ISCC–NBS descriptor: Strong yellow green
- B: Normalized to [0–255] (byte)

Acid green is a shade of yellow-green. Sources differ as to the exact color, but those shown here are representative.

=== Apple green ===
Apple green
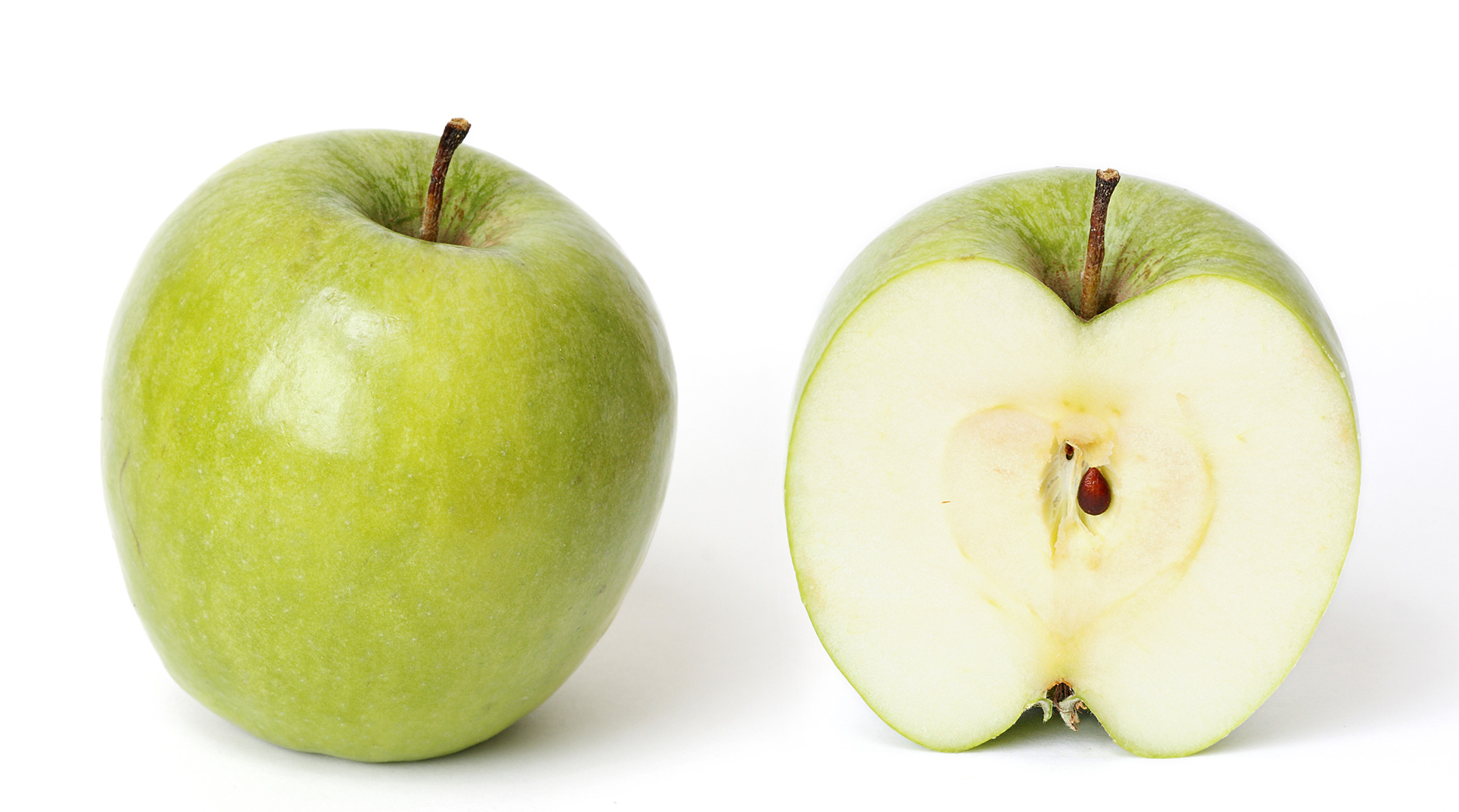
- A Granny Smith apple

Color coordinates
- Hex triplet: #8AB800
- sRGB^{B} (r, g, b): (138, 184, 0)
- HSV (h, s, v): (75°, 100%, 72%)
- CIELCh_{uv} (L, C, h): (69, 83, 106°)
- Source: ISCC-NBS
- ISCC–NBS descriptor: Vivid yellow green
- B: Normalized to [0–255] (byte)

Apple green is a representation of the color of the outer skin of a Granny Smith apple. A darker version of this color has been used for the IRT Lexington Avenue Line since June 1979, when the NYCTA decided to assign line colors to all the routes within the major trunk lines in the Central Business District, plus different colors for services not entering Manhattan. By doing this, they scrapped the 1967 colors that were assigned separately to each service, it was also used on locomotives of the London & North Eastern Railway.

The first recorded use of apple green as a color name in English was in 1648.

=== Artichoke green (Pantone) ===
Artichoke green (Pantone)
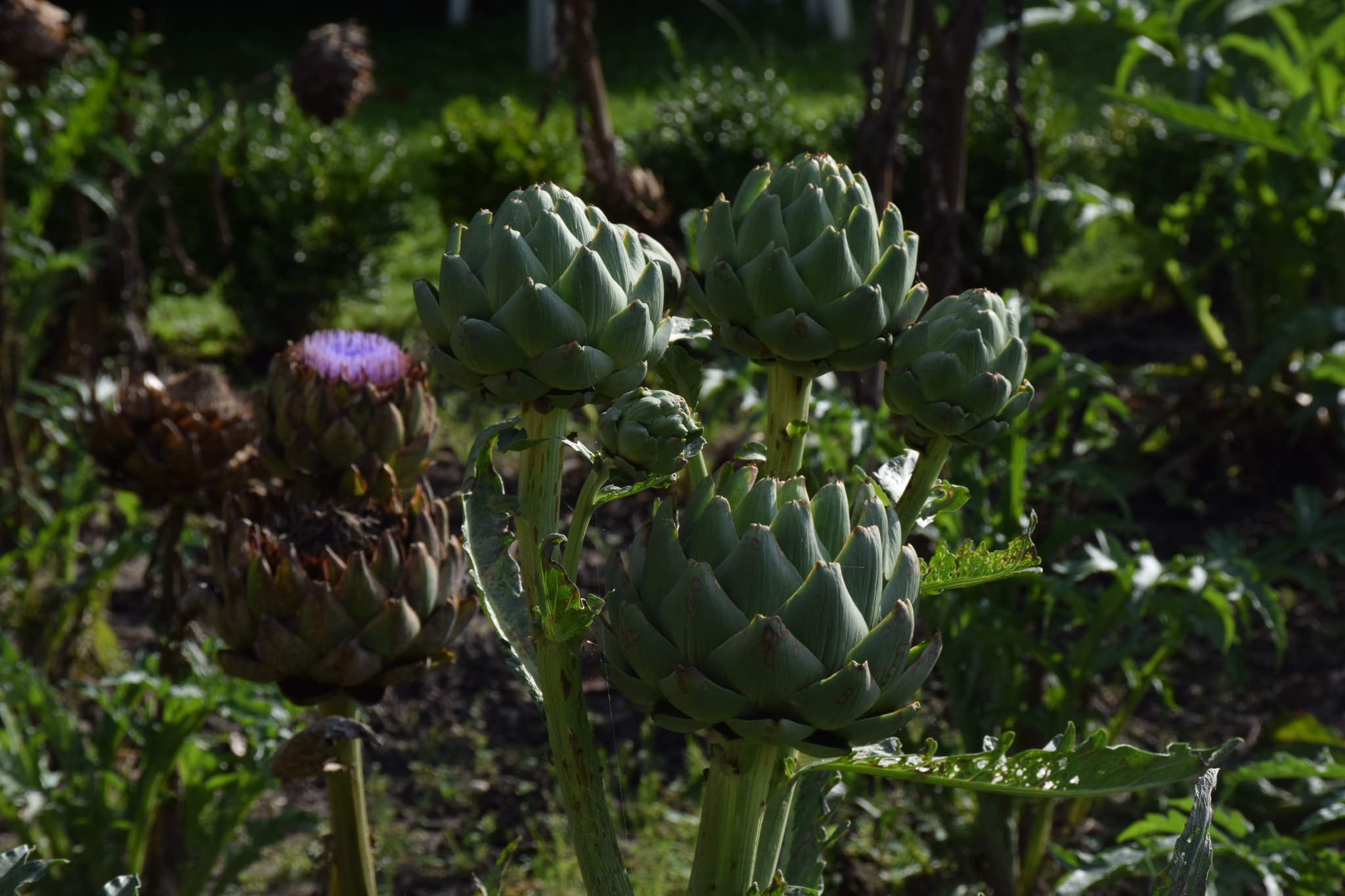

Color coordinates
- Hex triplet: #4B6F44
- sRGB^{B} (r, g, b): (75, 111, 68)
- HSV (h, s, v): (110°, 39%, 44%)
- CIELCh_{uv} (L, C, h): (43, 32, 123°)
- Source: Pantone
- ISCC–NBS descriptor: Dark yellowish green
- B: Normalized to [0–255] (byte)

This is the color called artichoke green in Pantone. The source is Pantone 18-0125 TPX.

=== Evergreen ===
Evergreen

Color coordinates
- Hex triplet: #05472A
- sRGB^{B} (r, g, b): (5, 71, 42)
- HSV (h, s, v): (154°, 93%, 28%)
- CIELCh_{uv} (L, C, h): (26, 27, 144°)
- Source: PicMonkey
- B: Normalized to [0–255] (byte)

Evergreen is a color that resembles evergreens.

It is currently unknown when evergreen was first used as a color name.

=== Fern green ===
Fern green
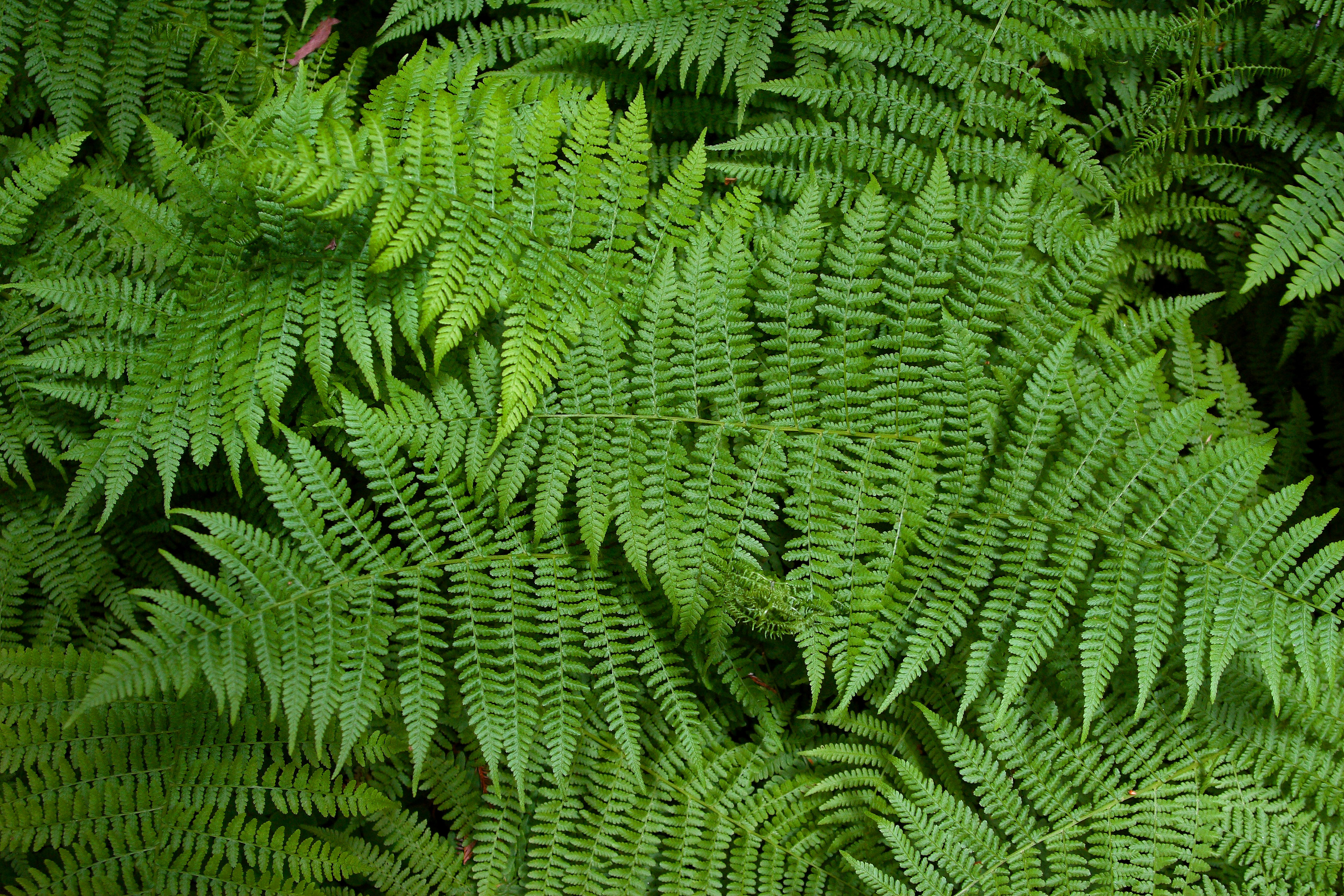
- Ferns at Muir Woods, California

Color coordinates
- Hex triplet: #4F7942
- sRGB^{B} (r, g, b): (79, 121, 66)
- HSV (h, s, v): (106°, 45%, 47%)
- CIELCh_{uv} (L, C, h): (47, 40, 121°)
- Source: Maerz and Paul
- ISCC–NBS descriptor: Dark yellowish green
- B: Normalized to [0–255] (byte)

Fern

Color coordinates
- Hex triplet: #63B76C
- sRGB^{B} (r, g, b): (99, 183, 108)
- HSV (h, s, v): (126°, 46%, 72%)
- CIELCh_{uv} (L, C, h): (68, 61, 130°)
- Source: Crayola colorxs.com
- ISCC–NBS descriptor: Brilliant yellowish green
- B: Normalized to [0–255] (byte)

Fern green is a color that resembles ferns. A Crayola crayon named fern was created in 1998.

The first recorded use of fern green as a color name in English was in 1902.

=== Forest green ===
Forest green
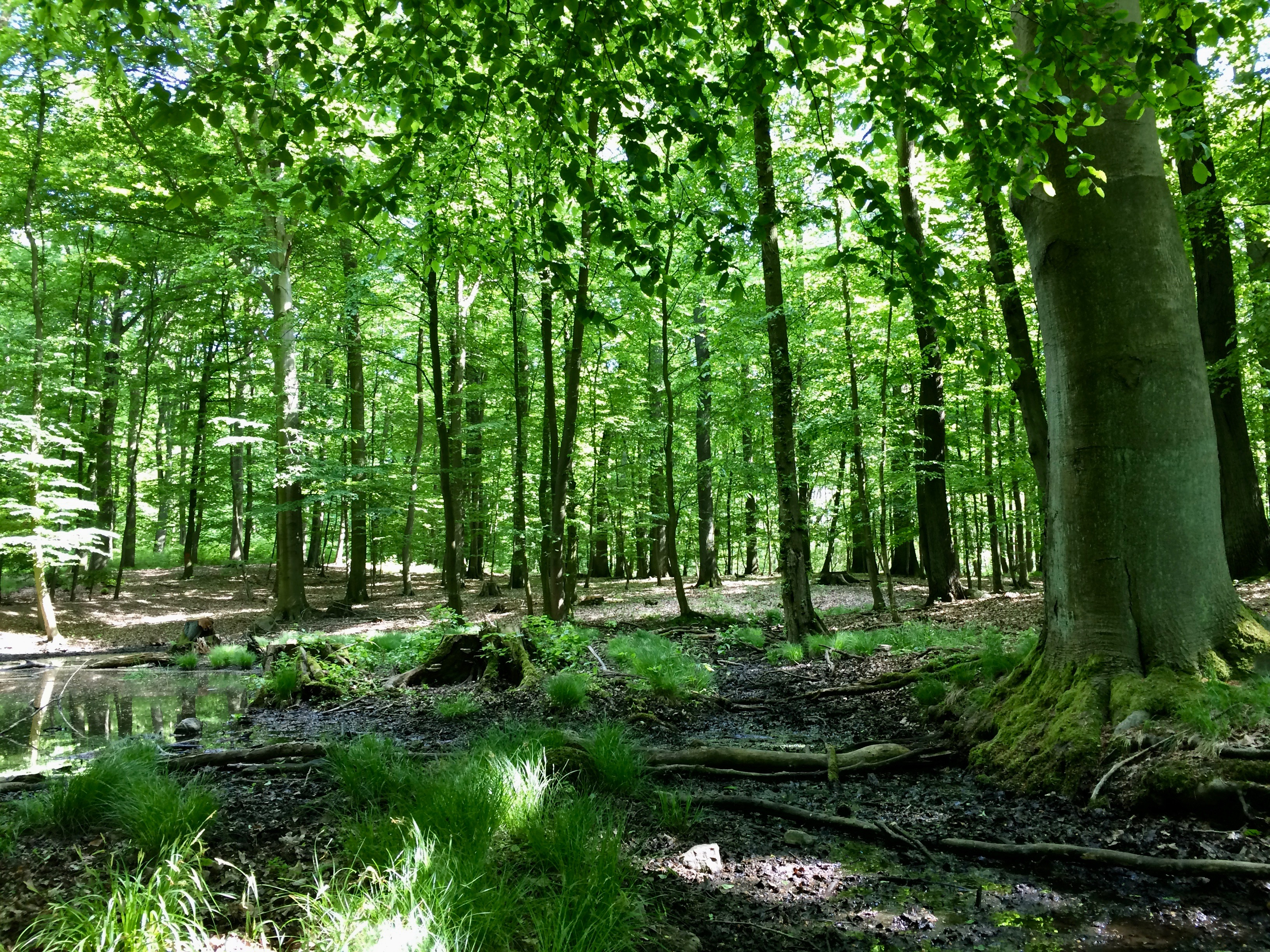
- A forest in Germany

Color coordinates
- Hex triplet: #228B22
- sRGB^{B} (r, g, b): (34, 139, 34)
- HSV (h, s, v): (120°, 76%, 55%)
- CIELCh_{uv} (L, C, h): (51, 70, 128°)
- Source: X11
- ISCC–NBS descriptor: Vivid yellowish green
- B: Normalized to [0–255] (byte)

Forest green refers to a green color said to resemble the color of the trees and other plants in a forest.

The first recorded use of forest green as the name of a color in the English language was in 1810.

=== Honeydew ===
Honeydew
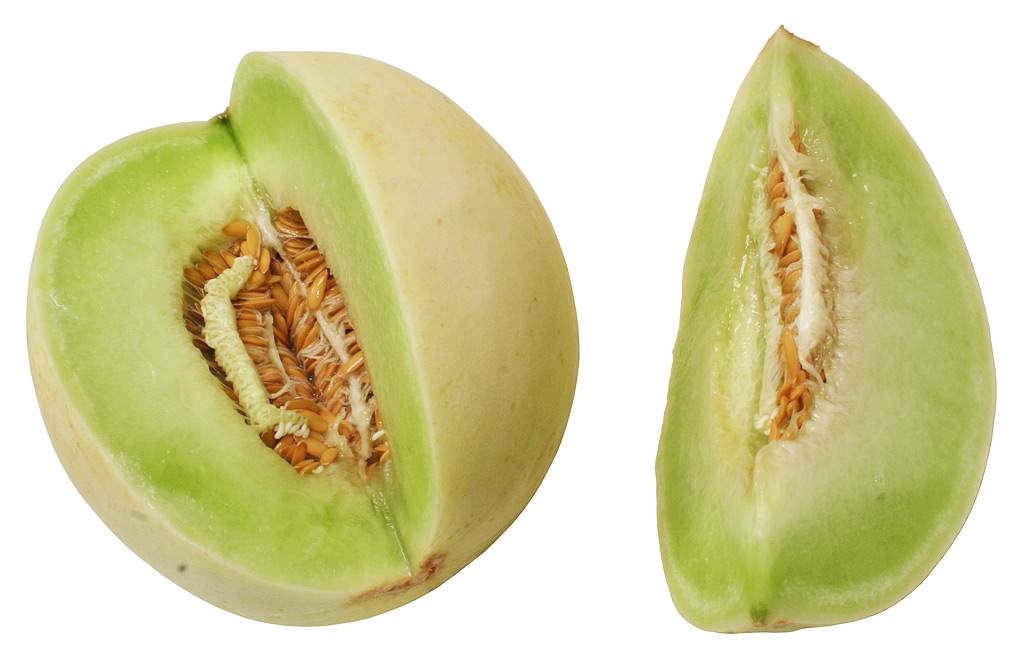
- Honeydew melons

Color coordinates
- Hex triplet: #F0FFF0
- sRGB^{B} (r, g, b): (240, 255, 240)
- HSV (h, s, v): (120°, 6%, 100%)
- CIELCh_{uv} (L, C, h): (99, 12, 128°)
- Source: X11
- ISCC–NBS descriptor: Very pale green
- B: Normalized to [0–255] (byte)

The color honeydew is a pale, greenish off-white based on the color of the interior flesh of a honeydew melon.

=== Jungle green ===
Jungle green

Color coordinates
- Hex triplet: #29AB87
- sRGB^{B} (r, g, b): (41, 171, 135)
- HSV (h, s, v): (163°, 76%, 67%)
- CIELCh_{uv} (L, C, h): (63, 52, 159°)
- Source: Crayola
- ISCC–NBS descriptor: Brilliant green
- B: Normalized to [0–255] (byte)

In 1990, Crayola named and formulated a specific tone called jungle green.

The first recorded use of jungle green as a name of a color in the English language was in 1926.

=== Kelly green ===
Kelly green
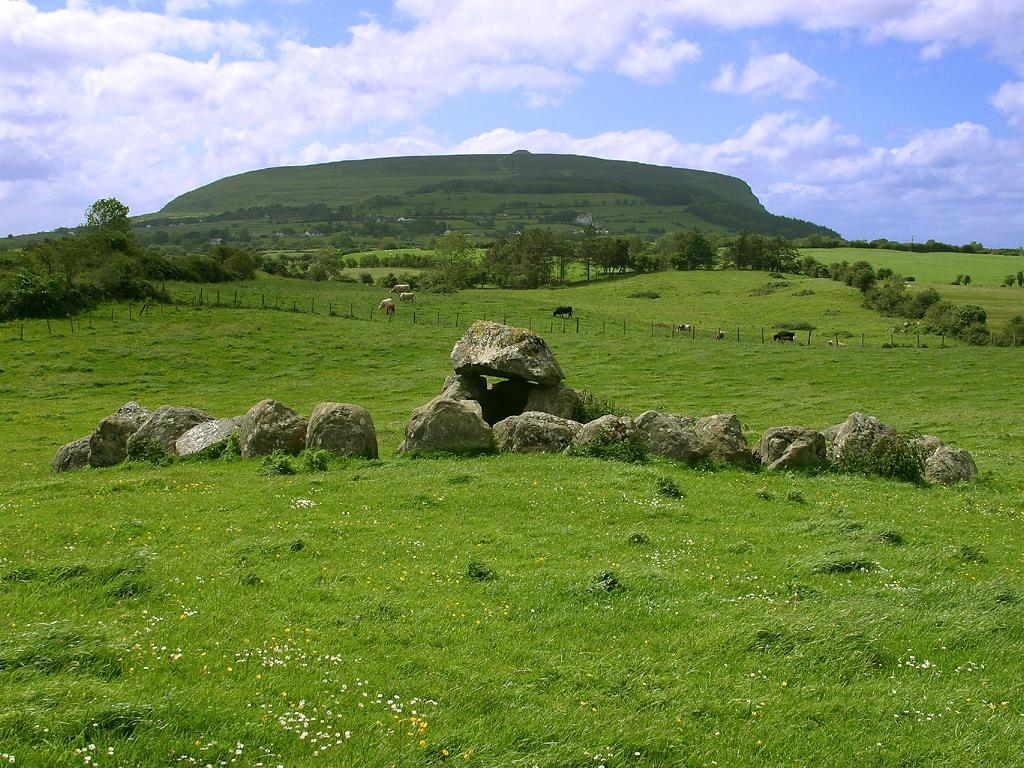
- Irish meadow

Color coordinates
- Hex triplet: #4CBB17
- sRGB^{B} (r, g, b): (76, 187, 23)
- HSV (h, s, v): (101°, 88%, 73%)
- CIELCh_{uv} (L, C, h): (67, 94, 123°)
- Source: canva.com
- ISCC–NBS descriptor: Brilliant green
- B: Normalized to [0–255] (byte)

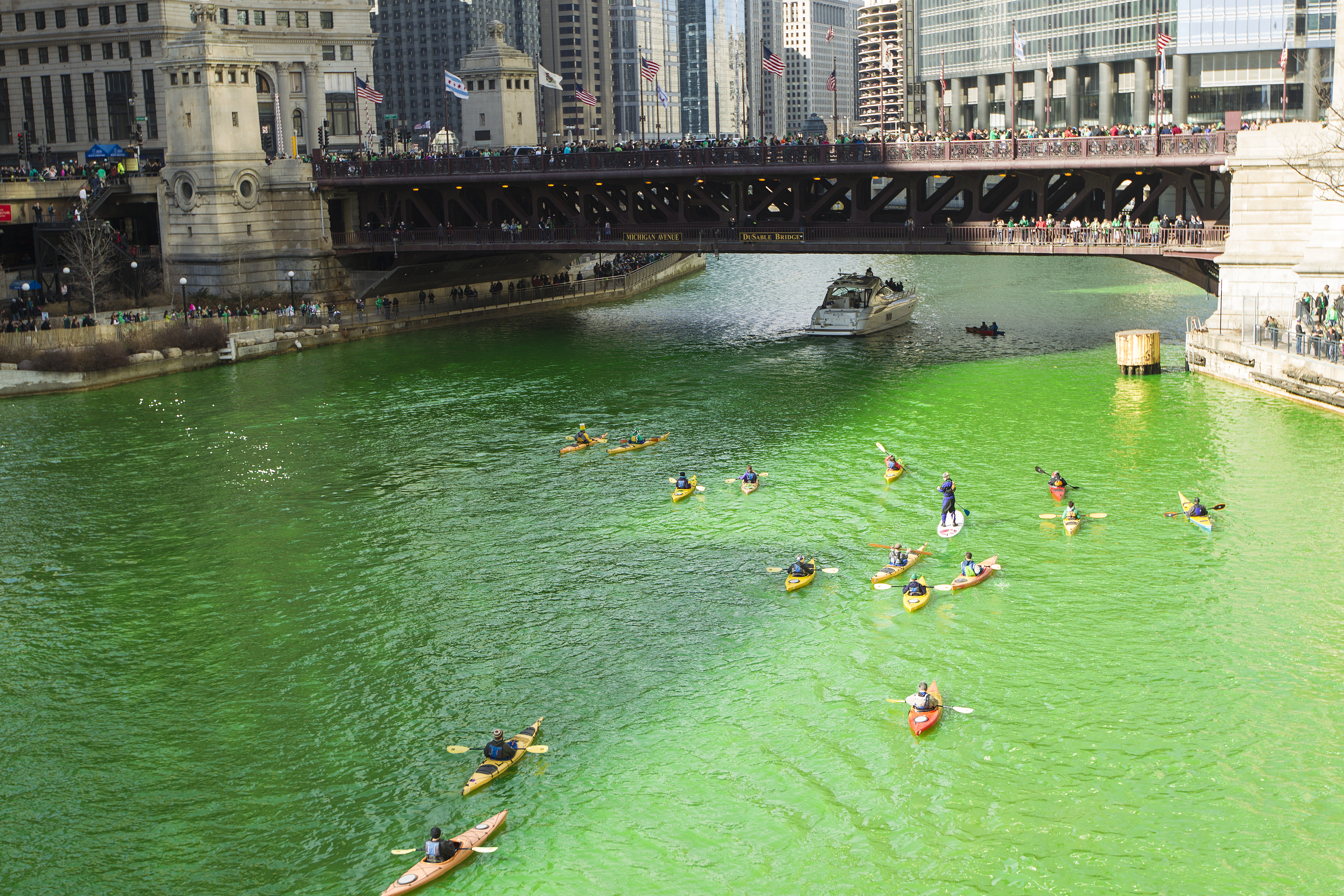
Chicago River dyed green for Saint Patrick's Day

Kelly green is an intense, pure green named after the common Irish family name, Kelly. It evokes the lush green Irish meadows and is also commonly associated with St. Patrick's Day.

=== Kombu green ===
Kombu green
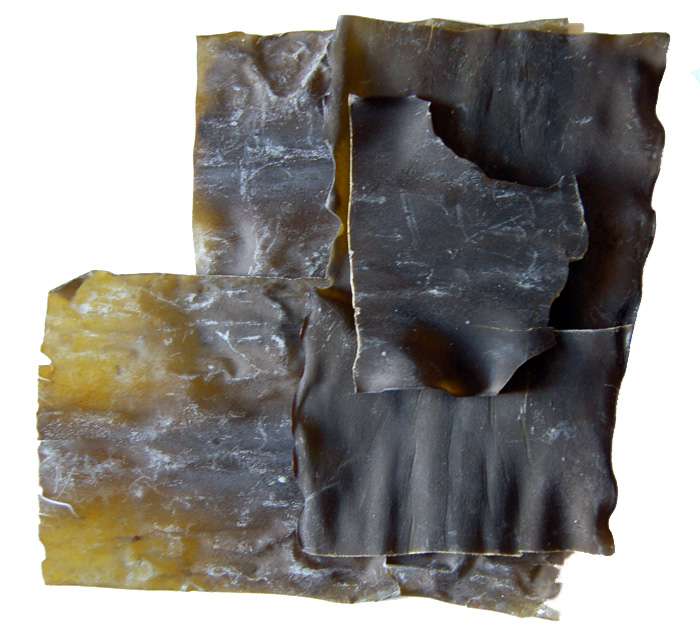
- Kombu from the kelp species Saccharina japonica, the source of most kombu

Color coordinates
- Hex triplet: #354230
- sRGB^{B} (r, g, b): (53, 66, 48)
- HSV (h, s, v): (103°, 27%, 26%)
- CIELCh_{uv} (L, C, h): (26, 12, 118°)
- Source: Pantone TPX
- ISCC–NBS descriptor: Dark olive green
- B: Normalized to [0–255] (byte)

The color kombu green is a representation of the color of kombu, edible kelp from the family Laminariaceae widely eaten in East Asia.

The source of this color is the "Pantone Textile Paper eXtended (TPX)" color list, color #19-0417 TPX—Kombu Green.

=== Laurel green ===
Laurel green
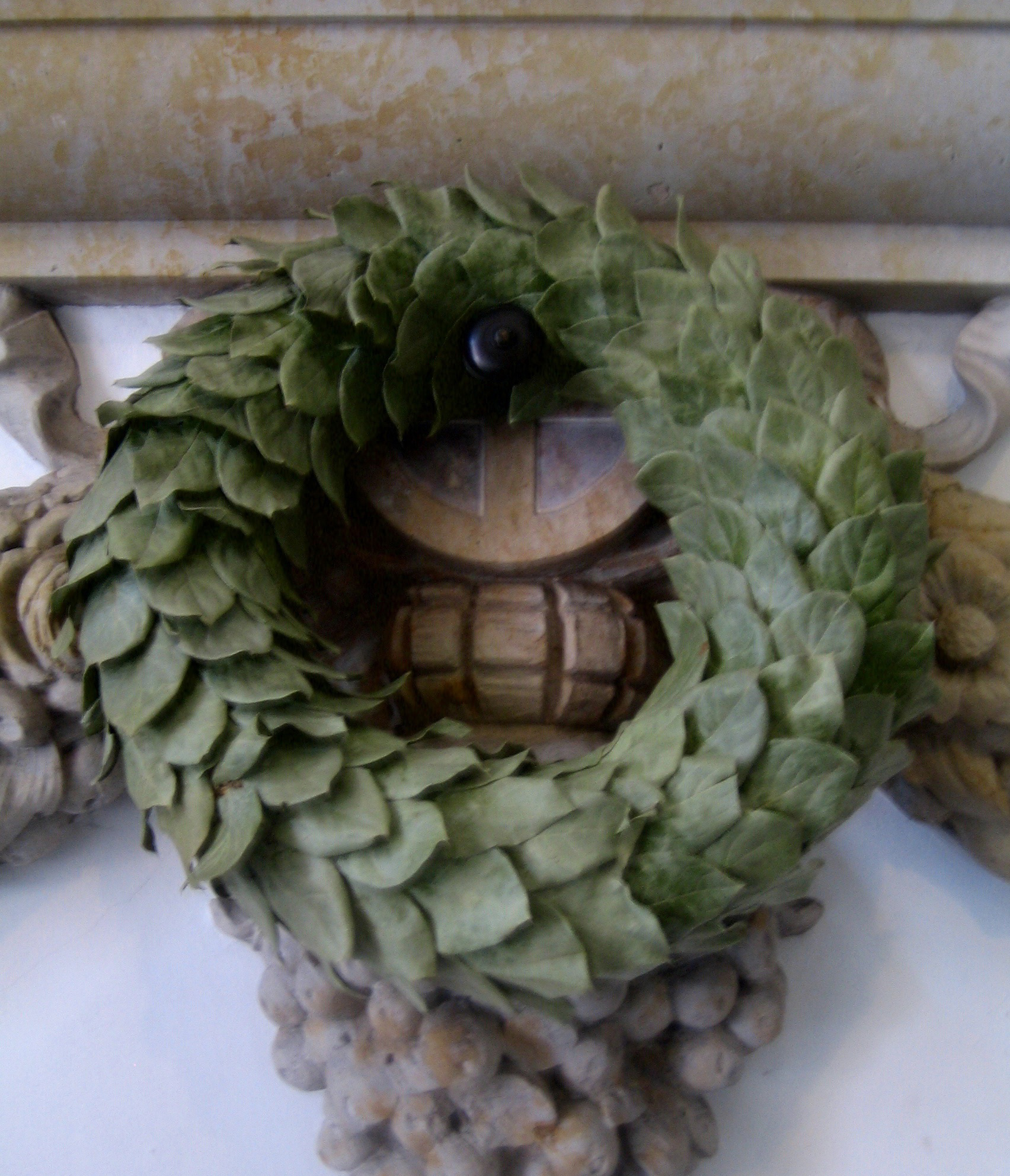
- A laurel wreath

Color coordinates
- Hex triplet: #A9BA9D
- sRGB^{B} (r, g, b): (169, 186, 157)
- HSV (h, s, v): (95°, 16%, 73%)
- CIELCh_{uv} (L, C, h): (74, 22, 112°)
- Source: Maerz and Paul
- ISCC–NBS descriptor: Moderate yellow green
- B: Normalized to [0–255] (byte)

Laurel green is a medium light hue of chartreuish gray similar to asparagus, but lighter.

The first recorded use of laurel green as a name of a color in the English language was in 1705.

=== Mantis ===
Mantis
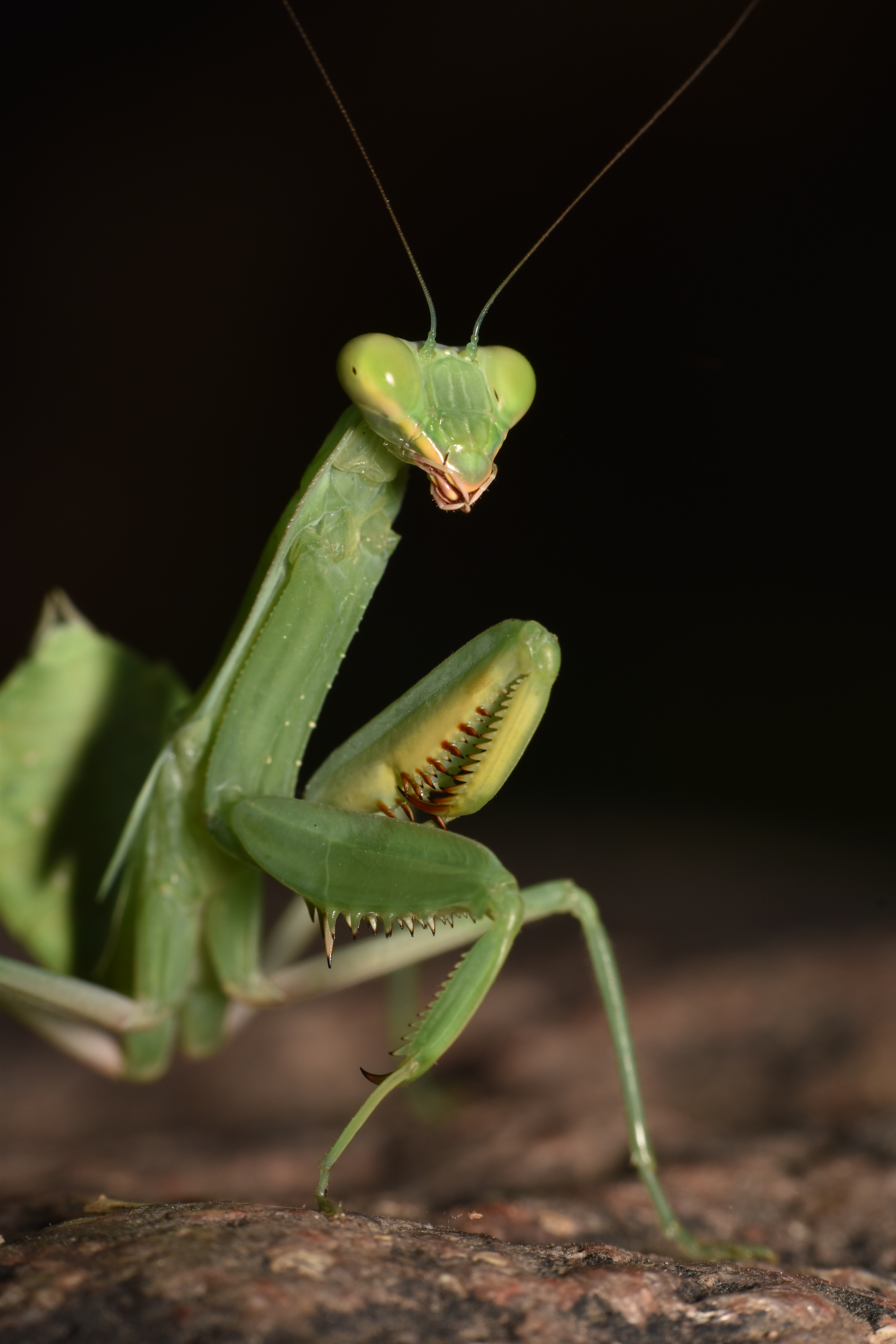
- A praying mantis.

Color coordinates
- Hex triplet: #74C365
- sRGB^{B} (r, g, b): (116, 195, 101)
- HSV (h, s, v): (110°, 48%, 76%)
- CIELCh_{uv} (L, C, h): (72, 69, 124°)
- Source: Xona.com color list
- ISCC–NBS descriptor: Brilliant yellowish green
- B: Normalized to [0–255] (byte)

Mantis green represents the green color of certain grass-dwelling species of praying mantis.

The first use of mantis as a color name in English was when it was included as one of the colors on the Xona.com color list, promulgated in 2001.

=== Moss green ===
Moss green
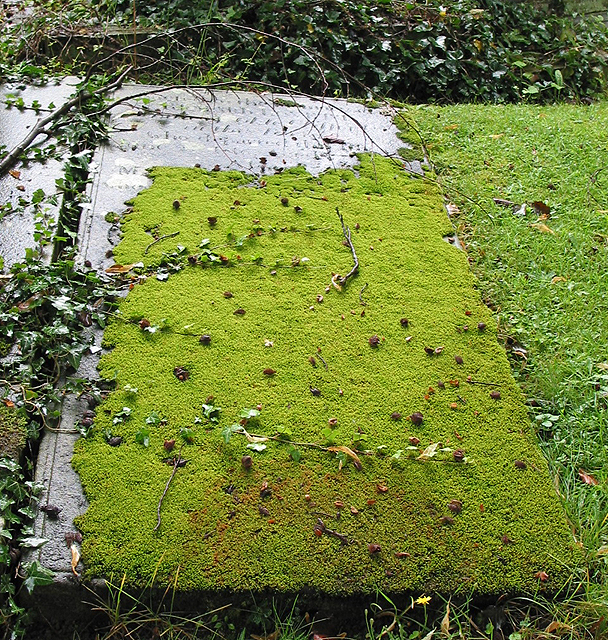
- Moss-covered grave

Color coordinates
- Hex triplet: #8A9A5B
- sRGB^{B} (r, g, b): (138, 154, 91)
- HSV (h, s, v): (75°, 41%, 60%)
- CIELCh_{uv} (L, C, h): (61, 42, 99°)
- Source: ISCC-NBS
- ISCC–NBS descriptor: Moderate yellow green
- B: Normalized to [0–255] (byte)

Moss is a tone of green that resembles green moss.

The first recorded use of moss green as a color name in English was in 1884.

=== Mint green ===
Mint green

Color coordinates
- Hex triplet: #98FB98
- sRGB^{B} (r, g, b): (152, 251, 152)
- HSV (h, s, v): (120°, 39%, 98%)
- CIELCh_{uv} (L, C, h): (91, 78, 128°)
- Source: X11
- ISCC–NBS descriptor: Vivid yellowish green
- B: Normalized to [0–255] (byte)

Mint green is a pale tint of green that resembles the color of mint green pigment, and was a popular color in the 1990s.

=== Myrtle ===
Myrtle
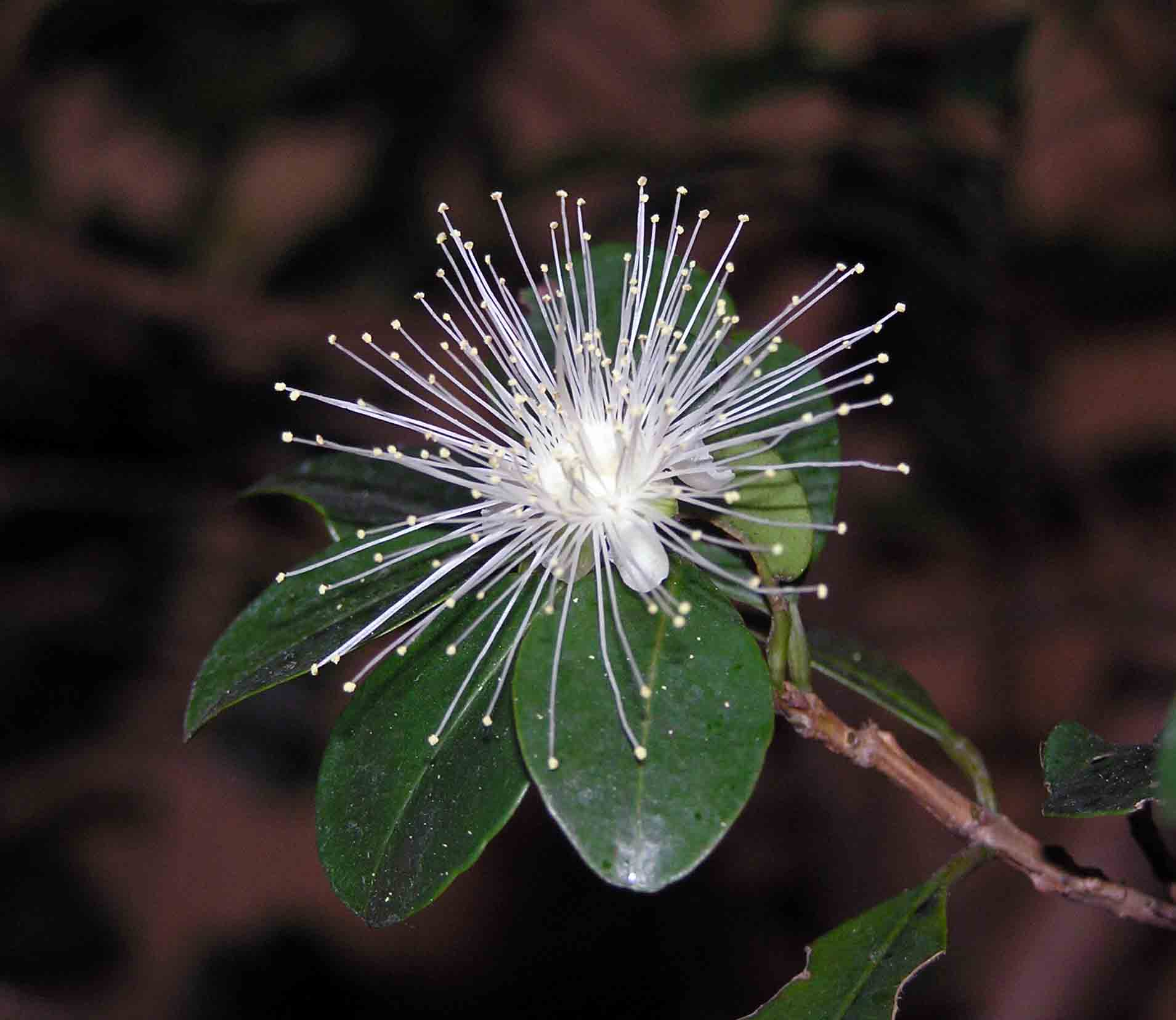
- Myrtus communis leaves and flower

Common connotations
- Myrtus

Color coordinates
- Hex triplet: #21421E
- sRGB^{B} (r, g, b): (33, 66, 30)
- HSV (h, s, v): (115°, 55%, 26%)
- CIELCh_{uv} (L, C, h): (25, 24, 126°)
- Source: ColorHexa
- B: Normalized to [0–255] (byte)

Myrtle is a dark green shade that resembles the color of Myrtus leaves.

=== Olive ===
Olive

Color coordinates
- Hex triplet: #808000
- sRGB^{B} (r, g, b): (128, 128, 0)
- HSV (h, s, v): (60°, 100%, 50%)
- CIELCh_{uv} (L, C, h): (52, 57, 86°)
- Source: X11 color names
- ISCC–NBS descriptor: Light olive
- B: Normalized to [0–255] (byte); H: Normalized to [0–100] (hundred)

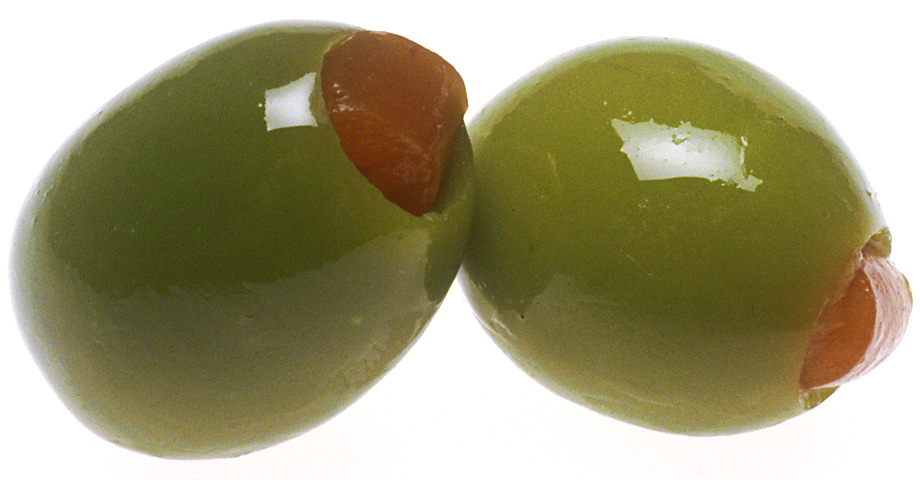
Green olives

Olive, also called olive green, is a dark yellowish-green color, like that of unripe or green olives.

As a color word in the English language, it appears in late Middle English. Shaded toward brown, it becomes olive drab.

=== Pine green ===
Pine green
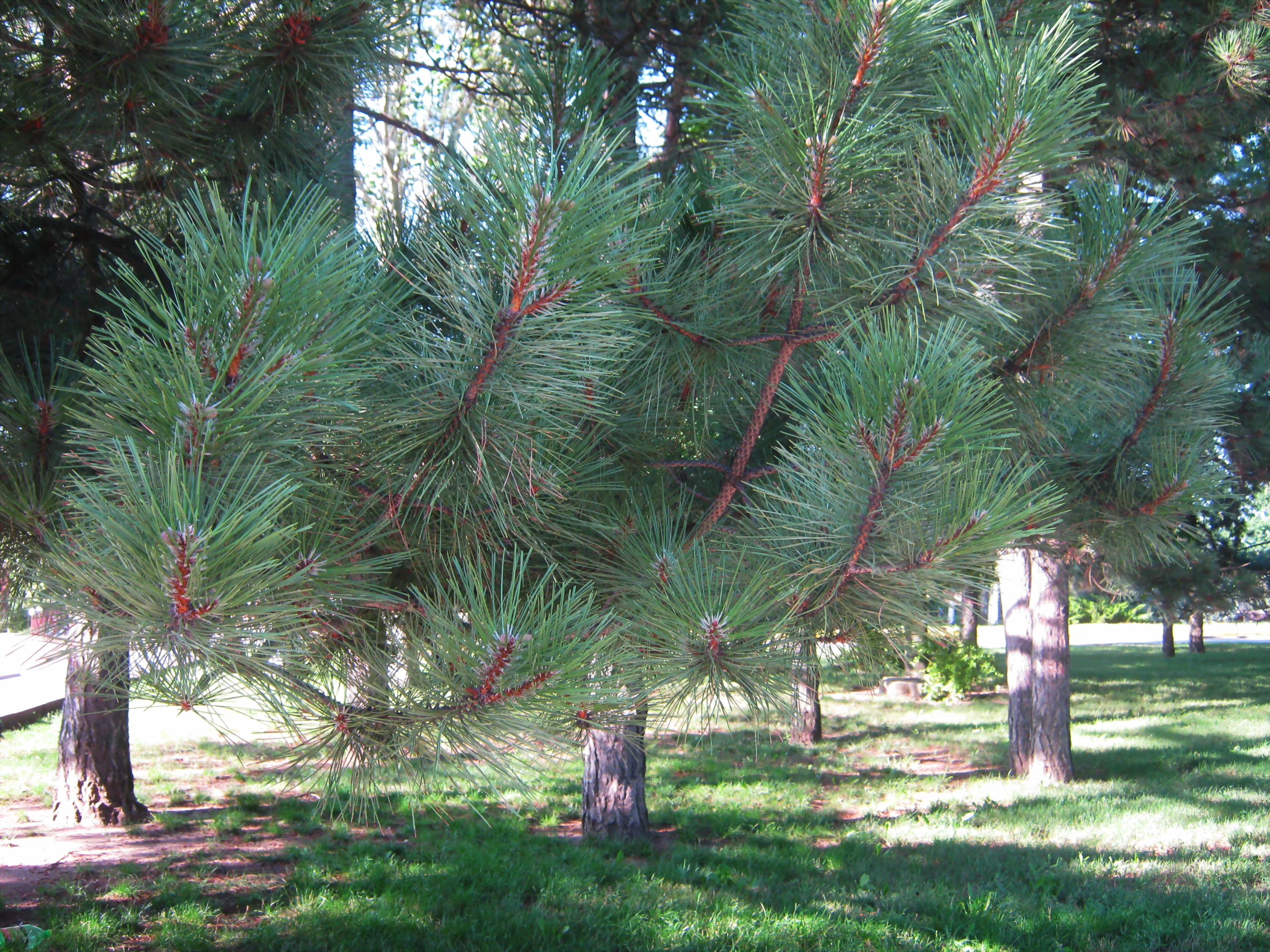
- Pinus nigra

Color coordinates
- Hex triplet: #01796F
- sRGB^{B} (r, g, b): (1, 121, 111)
- HSV (h, s, v): (175°, 99%, 47%)
- CIELCh_{uv} (L, C, h): (45, 36, 179°)
- Source: Crayola
- ISCC–NBS descriptor: Moderate bluish green
- B: Normalized to [0–255] (byte)

Pine green is a rich dark shade of cyan that resembles the color of pine trees. It is an official Crayola color that is this exact shade in the Crayola crayon, but in the markers, it is known as crocodile green.

The color pine green is a representation of the average color of the leaves of the trees of a coniferous forest. The color pine green was originally known as pine tree. The first recorded use of pine tree as a color name in English was in 1923.

=== Reseda green ===
Reseda green
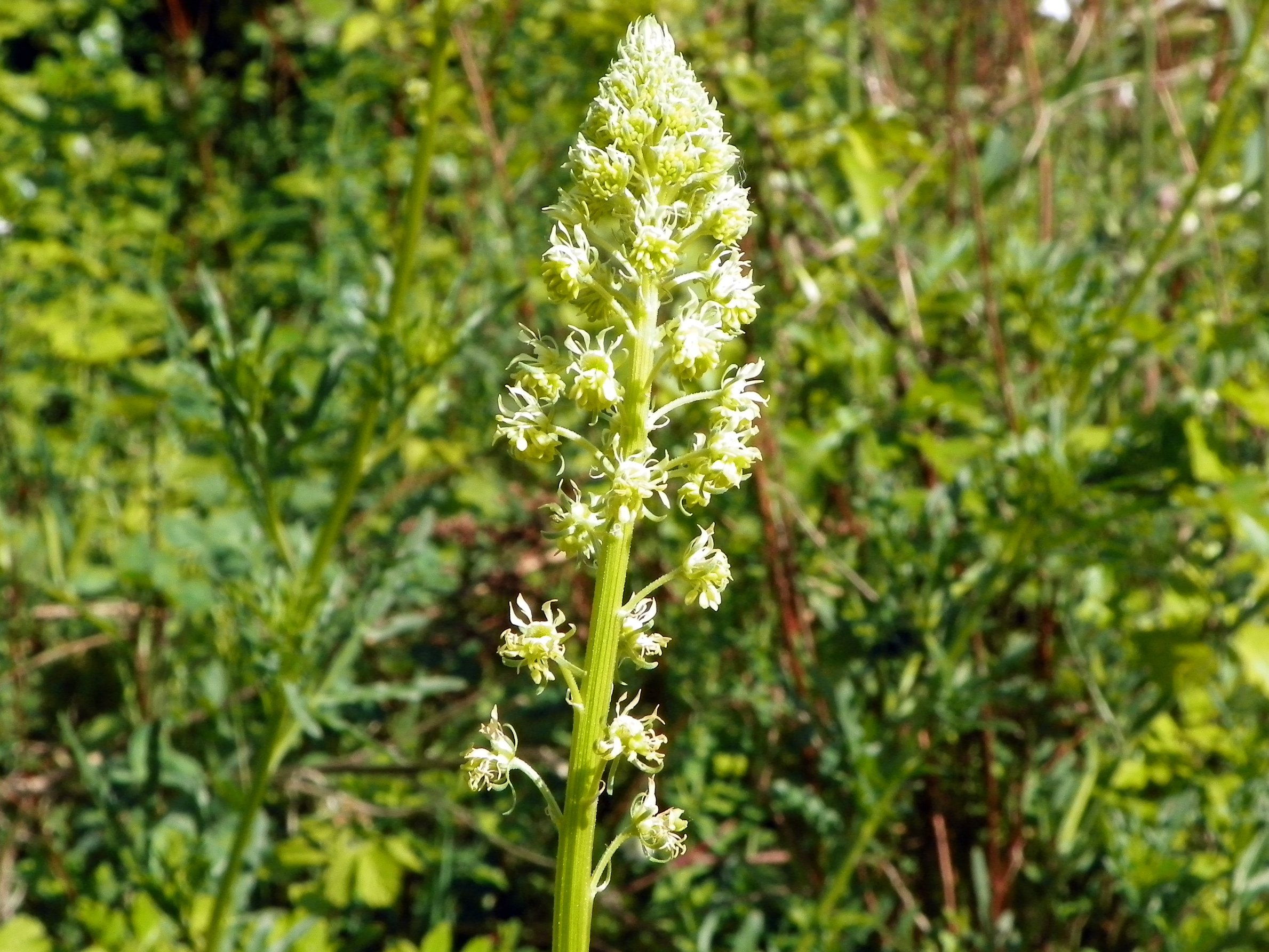
- Wild mignonette

Color coordinates
- Hex triplet: #6C7C59
- sRGB^{B} (r, g, b): (108, 124, 89)
- HSV (h, s, v): (87°, 28%, 49%)
- CIELCh_{uv} (L, C, h): (50, 25, 108°)
- ISCC–NBS descriptor: Moderate olive green
- B: Normalized to [0–255] (byte)

Reseda green is a shade of greyish green in the classic range of colors of the German RAL colour standard, in which it is named "RAL 6011".

The name derives from the color of the leaves of Reseda odorata, commonly known as mignonette.

=== Sap green ===
Sap green

Color coordinates
- Hex triplet: #507D2A
- sRGB^{B} (r, g, b): (80, 125, 42)
- HSV (h, s, v): (93°, 66%, 49%)
- CIELCh_{uv} (L, C, h): (48, 52, 115°)
- B: Normalized to [0–255] (byte)

Sap green is a green-looking pigment that was traditionally made of ripe buckthorn berries mixed with alum. However, modern colors marketed under this name are usually a blend of other pigments, commonly with a basis of phthalocyanine Green G. It is one of the greens used in The Joy of Painting.

=== Tea green ===
Tea green
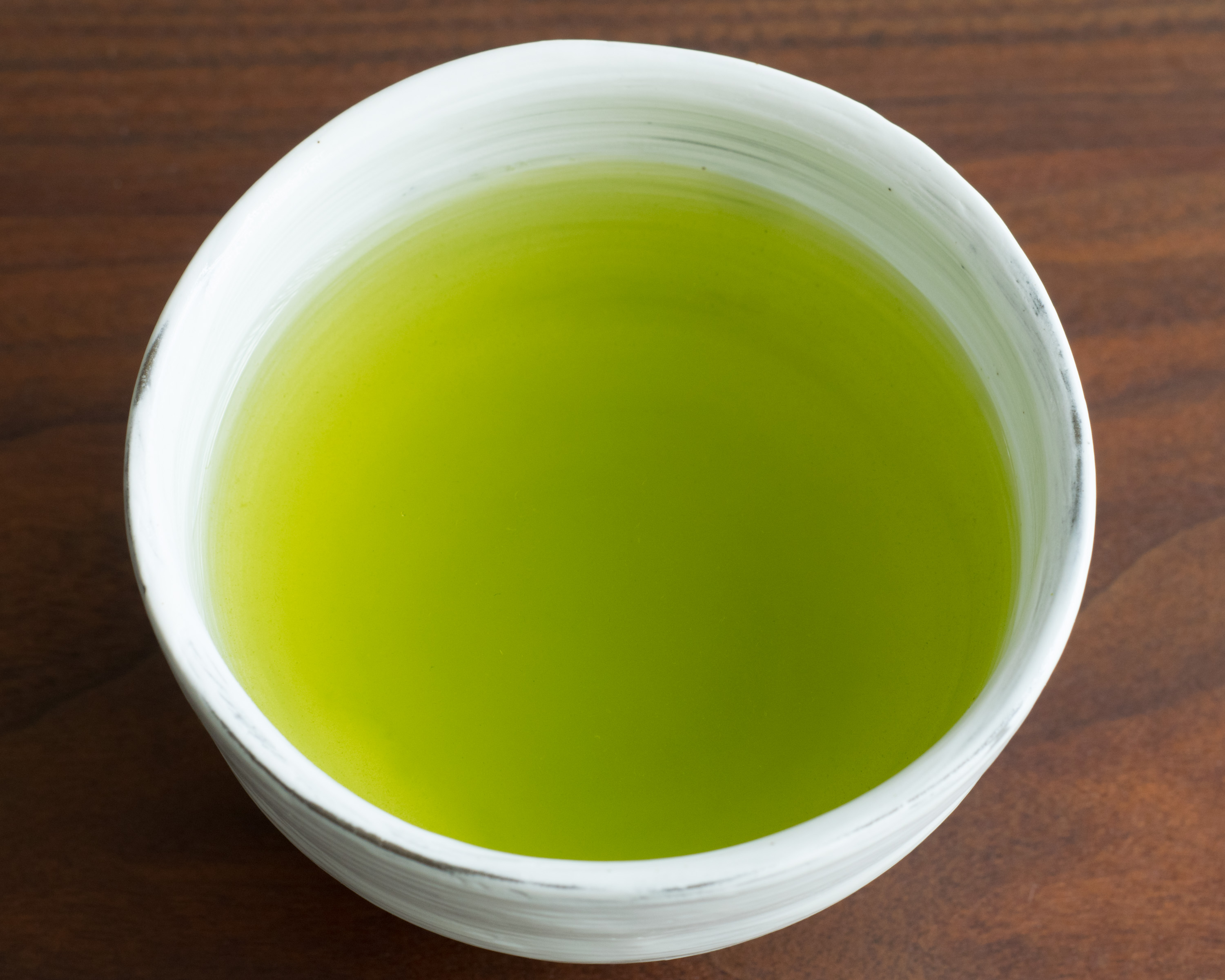
- Green tea.

Color coordinates
- Hex triplet: #D0F0C0
- sRGB^{B} (r, g, b): (208, 240, 192)
- HSV (h, s, v): (100°, 20%, 94%)
- CIELCh_{uv} (L, C, h): (91, 36, 116°)
- Source: Encycolorpedia
- ISCC–NBS descriptor: Very light yellowish green
- B: Normalized to [0–255] (byte)

Tea green is a light shade of green. It is a representation of the color of brewed green tea, i.e., the color of the hot green tea after the green tea leaves have been brewed in boiling water.

The first recorded use of tea green as a color name in English was in 1858.

== Green in non-biological nature ==
=== Emerald ===
Emerald as a quinary color
on the RYB color wheel
green
emerald
viridian

Emerald
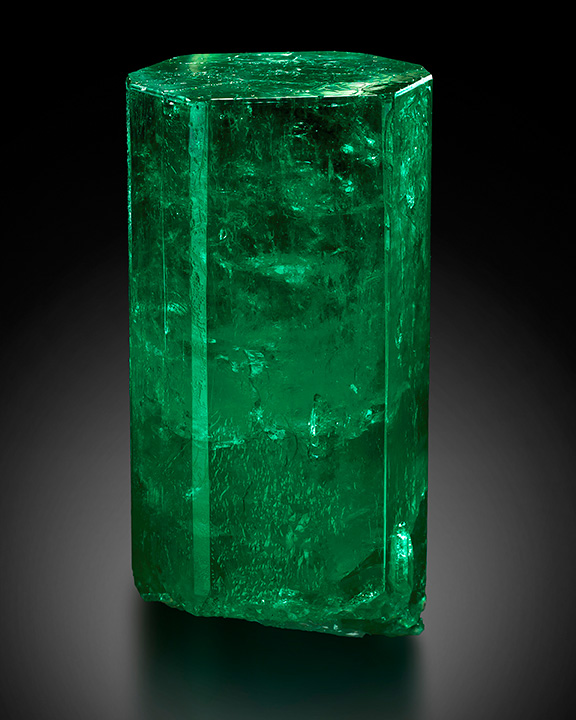
- An emerald

Color coordinates
- Hex triplet: #00FF60
- sRGB^{B} (r, g, b): (0, 255, 96)
- HSV (h, s, v): (143°, 100%, 100%)
- CIELCh_{uv} (L, C, h): (88, 121, 132°)
- Source: Secondary color
- ISCC–NBS descriptor: Vivid yellowish green
- B: Normalized to [0–255] (byte)

Emerald, also called emerald green, is a tone of green that is particularly light and bright, with a faint bluish cast. The name derives from the typical appearance of the emerald gemstone. The first recorded use of emerald as a color name in English was in 1598.

Ireland is sometimes referred to as the Emerald Isle due to its lush greenery. The May birthstone is emerald. Seattle is sometimes referred to as the Emerald City, because its abundant rainfall creates lush vegetation. In the Middle Ages, The Emerald Tablet of Hermes Trismegistus was believed to contain the secrets of alchemy. "Emerald City", from the story of The Wonderful Wizard of Oz, by L. Frank Baum, is a city where everything from food to people are emerald green. However, it is revealed at the end of the story that everything in the city is normal colored, but the glasses everyone wears are emerald tinted. The Green Zone in Baghdad is sometimes ironically and cynically referred to as the Emerald City. The Emerald Buddha is a figurine of the sitting Buddha, made of green jade (rather than emerald), clothed in gold, and about 45 cm tall. It is kept in the Chapel of the Emerald Buddha (Wat Phra Kaew) on the grounds of the Grand Palace in Bangkok. The Emerald Triangle refers to the three counties of Mendocino, Humboldt, and Trinity in Northern California, United States because these three counties are the biggest marijuana producing counties in California and also the US. A county-commissioned study reports pot accounts for up to two-thirds of the economy of Mendocino. Emerald Cities: Urban Sustainability and Economic Development is a book published in 2010 by Joan Fitzgerald, director of the law, policy and society program at Northeastern University, about ecologically sustainable city planning.

An emerald pigment was invented in Germany in 1814. By taking acetic acid, mixing and boiling it with vinegar, and then by adding some arsenic, a bright blue-green hue was formed. This toxic inorganic compound was marketed in England during the 19th century under the name Paris green. Victorian women used this bright color for dresses, and florists used it on fake flowers. It became notorious for causing deaths due to it being a popular color used for wallpaper.

=== Green earth ===
Green earth

Color coordinates
- Hex triplet: #DADD98
- sRGB^{B} (r, g, b): (218, 221, 152)
- HSV (h, s, v): (63°, 31%, 87%)
- CIELCh_{uv} (L, C, h): (86, 48, 88°)
- Source: Derwent
- ISCC–NBS descriptor: Light yellow green
- B: Normalized to [0–255] (byte)

The color green earth is also known as terre verte and Verona green. It is an inorganic pigment derived from the minerals celadonite and glauconite.

=== Hooker's green ===
Hooker's green

Color coordinates
- Hex triplet: #49796B
- sRGB^{B} (r, g, b): (73, 121, 107)
- HSV (h, s, v): (162°, 40%, 47%)
- CIELCh_{uv} (L, C, h): (47, 23, 164°)
- Source: Winsor & Newton
- ISCC–NBS descriptor: Moderate green
- B: Normalized to [0–255] (byte)

Hooker's green is a dark green color created by mixing Prussian blue and gamboge. Hooker's green takes its name from botanical artist William Hooker (1779–1832) who first created it particularly for illustrating leaves.

=== Jade ===
Jade
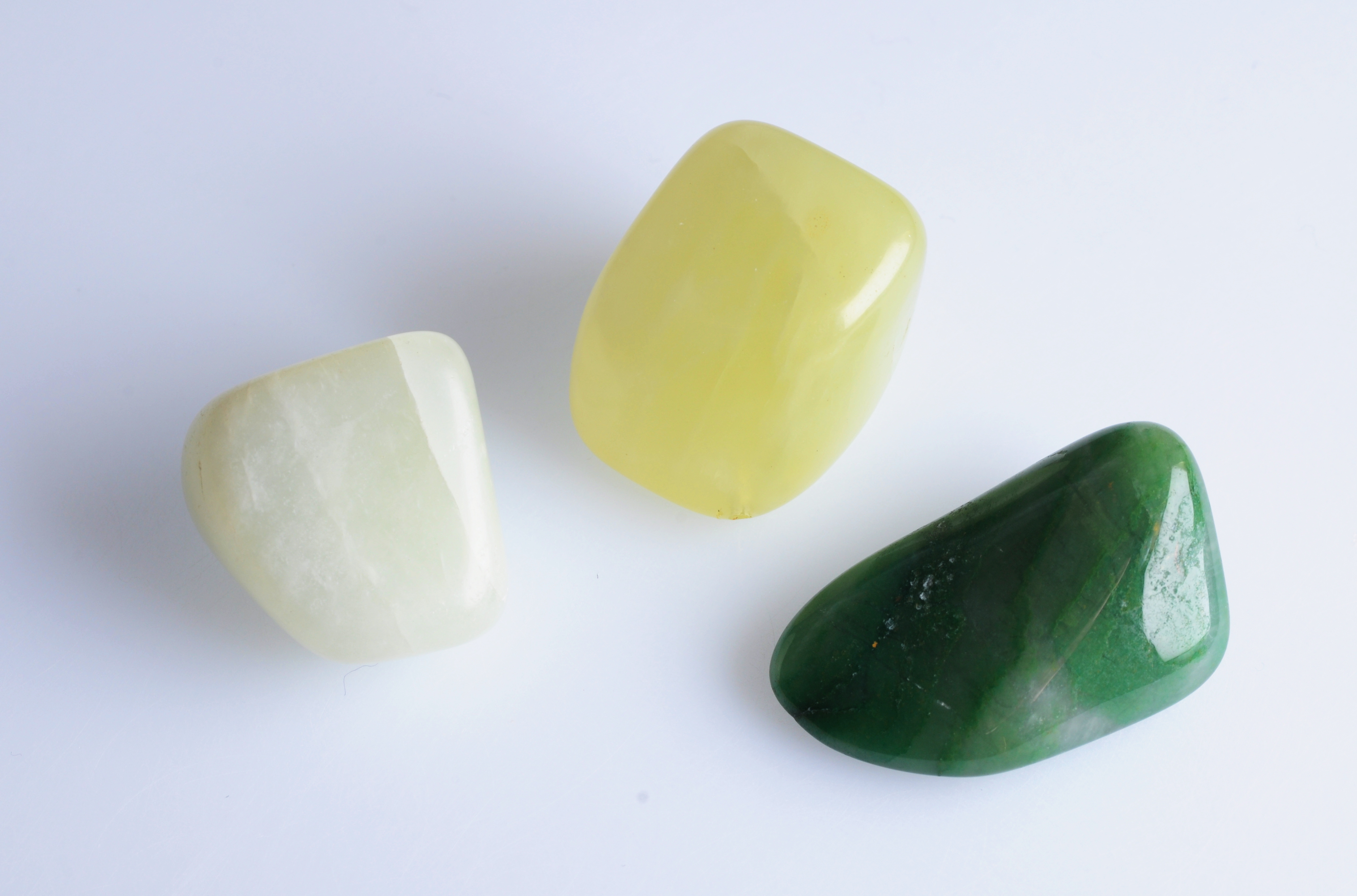
- Three color variations of jade.

Color coordinates
- Hex triplet: #00FF9F
- sRGB^{B} (r, g, b): (0, 255, 159)
- HSV (h, s, v): (157°, 100%, 100%)
- CIELCh_{uv} (L, C, h): (89, 96, 144°)
- ISCC–NBS descriptor: Strong yellowish green
- B: Normalized to [0–255] (byte)

Jade, also called jade green, is a representation of the color of the gemstone called jade, although the stone itself varies widely in hue.

The color name jade green was first used in Spanish in the form piedra de ijada in 1569. The first recorded use of jade green as a color name in English was in 1892.

=== Malachite ===
Malachite
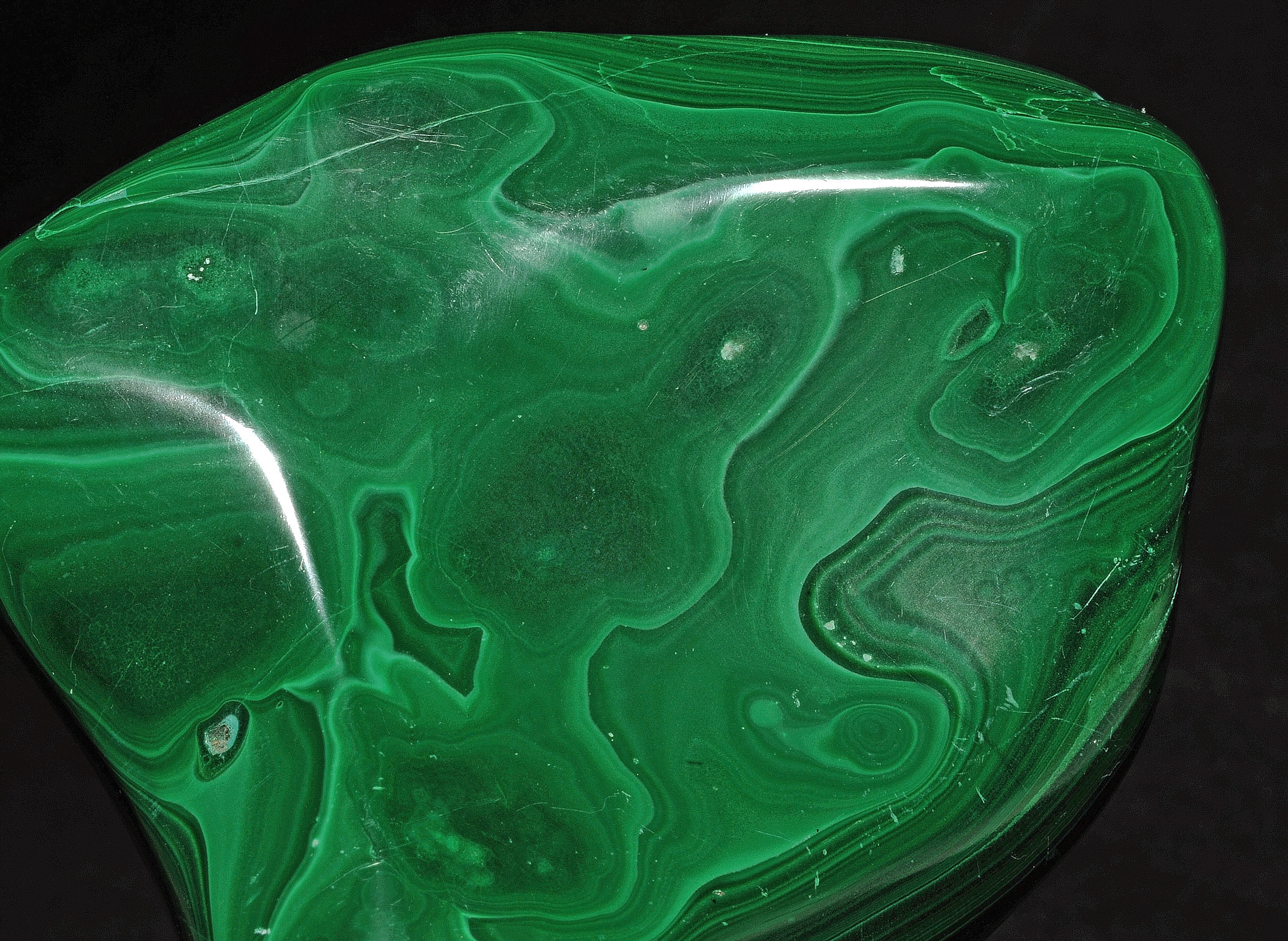
- Polished malachite

Color coordinates
- Hex triplet: #0BDA51
- sRGB^{B} (r, g, b): (11, 218, 81)
- HSV (h, s, v): (140°, 95%, 85%)
- CIELCh_{uv} (L, C, h): (77, 104, 132°)
- Source: Maerz and Paul
- ISCC–NBS descriptor: Vivid yellowish green
- B: Normalized to [0–255] (byte)

Malachite, also called malachite green, is a color that is a representation of the color of the mineral malachite.

The first recorded use of malachite green as a color name in English was in the 1200s (exact year uncertain).

=== Sea green ===
Sea green
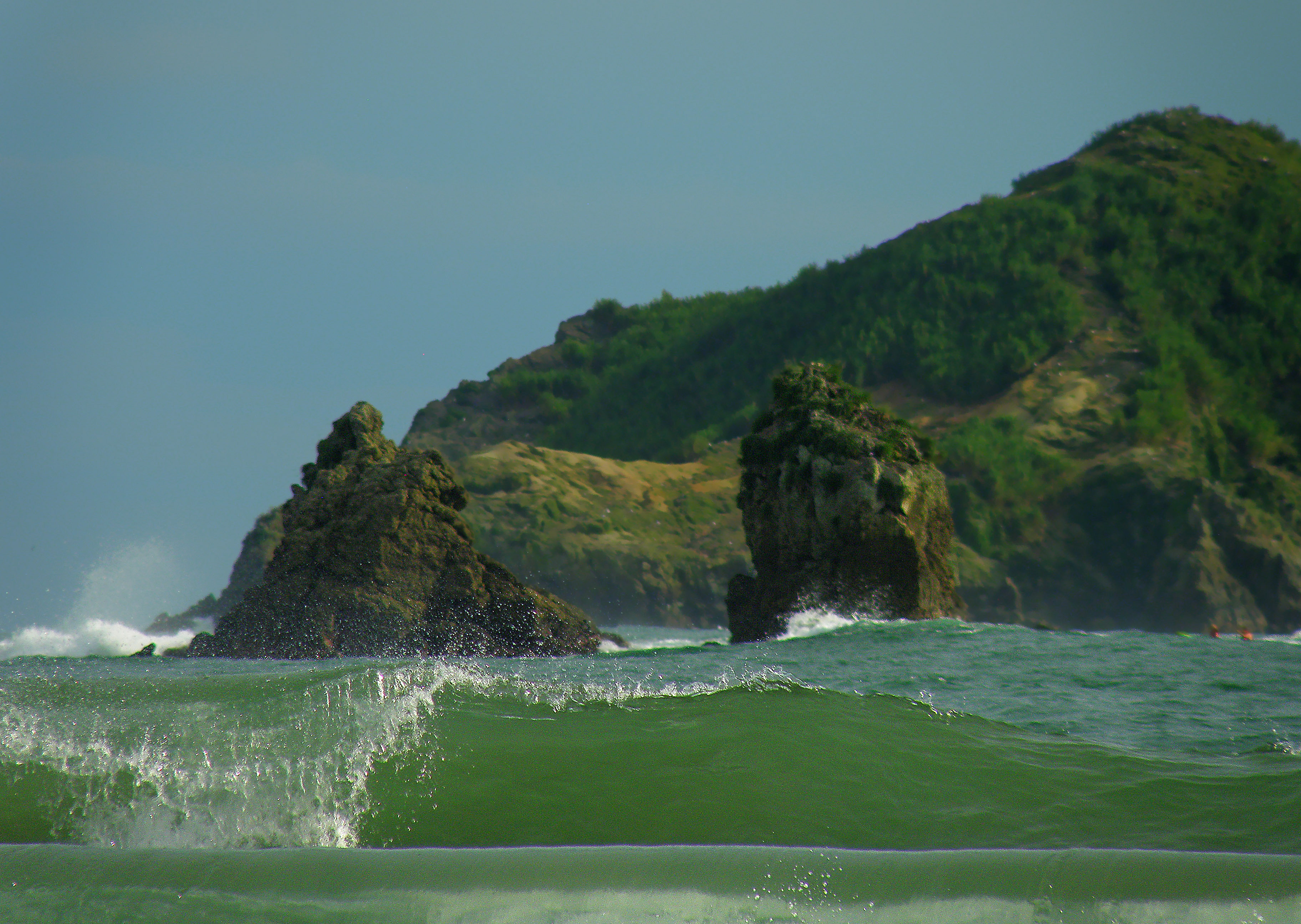
- Sea at Manuel Antonio Beach, Costa Rica

Color coordinates
- Hex triplet: #2E8B57
- sRGB^{B} (r, g, b): (46, 139, 87)
- HSV (h, s, v): (146°, 67%, 55%)
- CIELCh_{uv} (L, C, h): (52, 50, 141°)
- Source: HTML/CSS
- ISCC–NBS descriptor: Strong yellowish green
- B: Normalized to [0–255] (byte)

Sea green is a color that resembles the hue of shallow seawater as seen from the surface.

== Other notable green colors ==
=== Brat green ===
Brat green
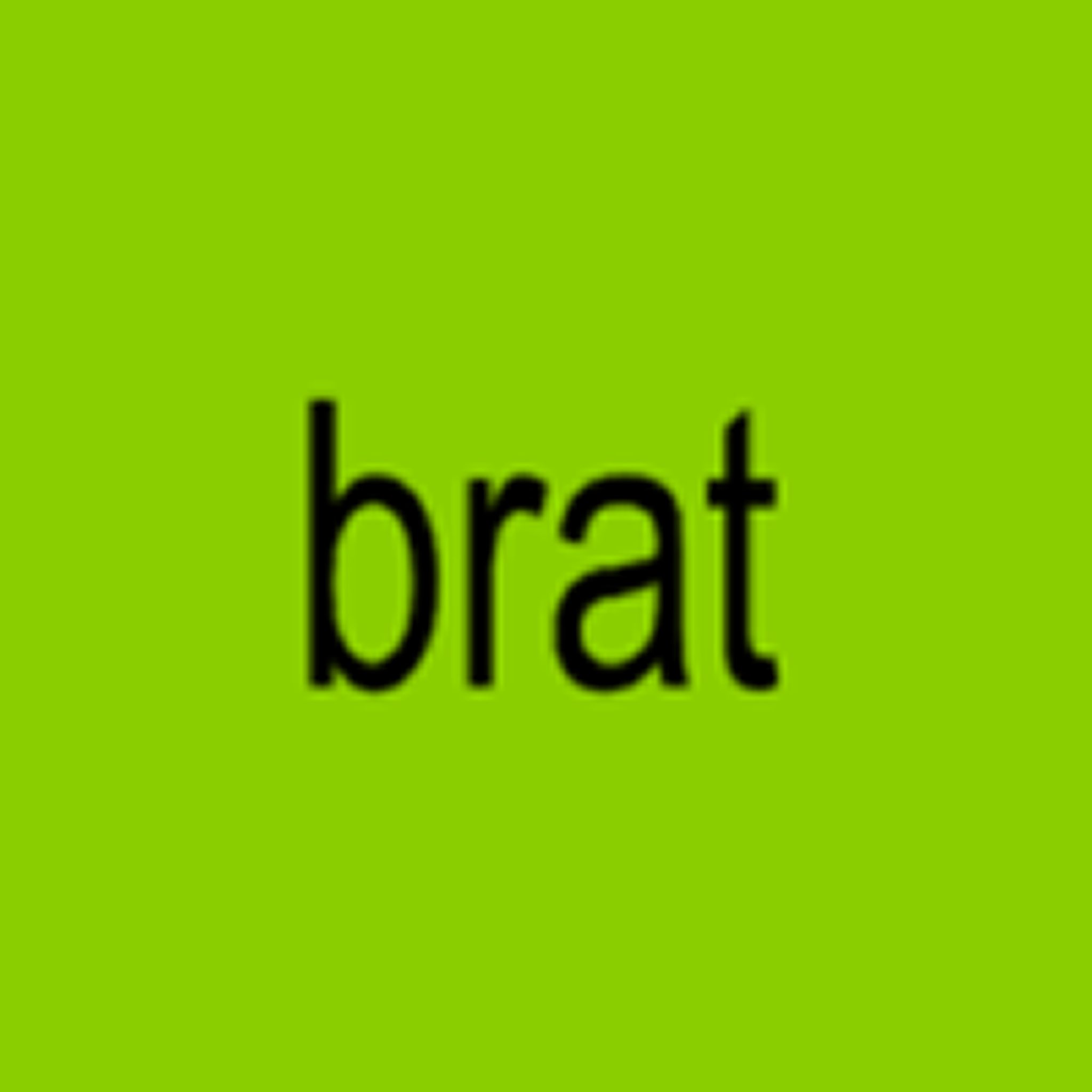
- The artwork for Brat

Color coordinates
- Hex triplet: #8ACE00
- sRGB^{B} (r, g, b): (138, 206, 0)
- HSV (h, s, v): (80°, 100%, 81%)
- CIELCh_{uv} (L, C, h): (76, 95, 111°)
- Source: Encycolorpedia
- ISCC–NBS descriptor: Vivid yellowish green
- B: Normalized to [0–255] (byte)

Brat green is the popular name of a specific shade of green, often described as and compared with lime green. It got famous across the internet after the release of Brat (2024), the sixth studio album by the British singer Charli xcx. It was embraced not only in the album's marketing, but also in several other brands' marketing and even in the 2024 presidential campaign of Kamala Harris.

=== Celadon ===
Celadon
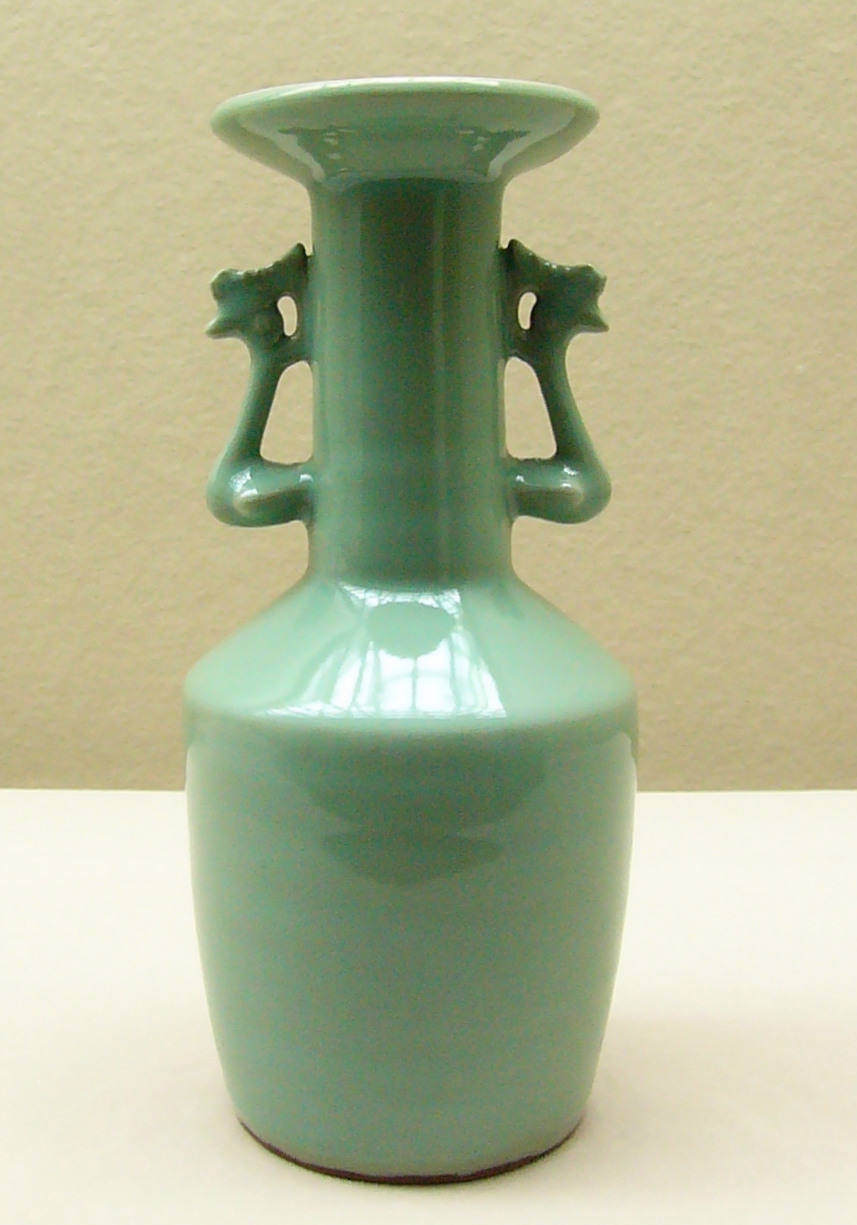
- A celadon vase

Color coordinates
- Hex triplet: #ACE1AF
- sRGB^{B} (r, g, b): (172, 225, 175)
- HSV (h, s, v): (123°, 24%, 88%)
- CIELCh_{uv} (L, C, h): (85, 42, 129°)
- Source: Encycolorpedia
- ISCC–NBS descriptor: Light yellowish green
- B: Normalized to [0–255] (byte)

Celadon /ˈsɛlədɒn/ is a pale greyish shade of green, or rather a range of such shades. Celadon originates as a term for a class of Chinese ceramics, copied by Korea and Japan. However, the name, which is European, may originate from the character Celadon in L'Astrée, a French pastoral novel of 1627, who wore a light green color.

Celadon glazes were very common, with the green color being reliably produced from about the tenth century onwards; this was appreciated in Asia for resembling jade, the most prestigious material of all. The glaze color comes from iron oxide's transformation from ferric to ferrous iron (Fe_{2}O_{3} → FeO) during the firing process, but is affected by a wide range of other factors and chemicals, making the precise color very difficult to control. As well as green, a wide range of browns, yellows, greys and sometimes blues all count as "celadon".

=== Hungarian green ===
Hungarian green
- Flag of Hungary

Color coordinates
- Hex triplet: #477050
- sRGB^{B} (r, g, b): (71, 112, 80)
- HSV (h, s, v): (133°, 37%, 44%)
- CIELCh_{uv} (L, C, h): (44, 28, 135°)
- Source: Pantone
- ISCC–NBS descriptor: Dark green
- B: Normalized to [0–255] (byte)

The web color Hungarian green is a dark green color seen on the national flag of Hungary.

=== Hunter green ===
Hunter green

Color coordinates
- Hex triplet: #355E3B
- sRGB^{B} (r, g, b): (53, 94, 59)
- HSV (h, s, v): (129°, 44%, 37%)
- CIELCh_{uv} (L, C, h): (36, 28, 132°)
- Source: ISCC-NBS No. 137
- ISCC–NBS descriptor: Dark yellowish green
- B: Normalized to [0–255] (byte)

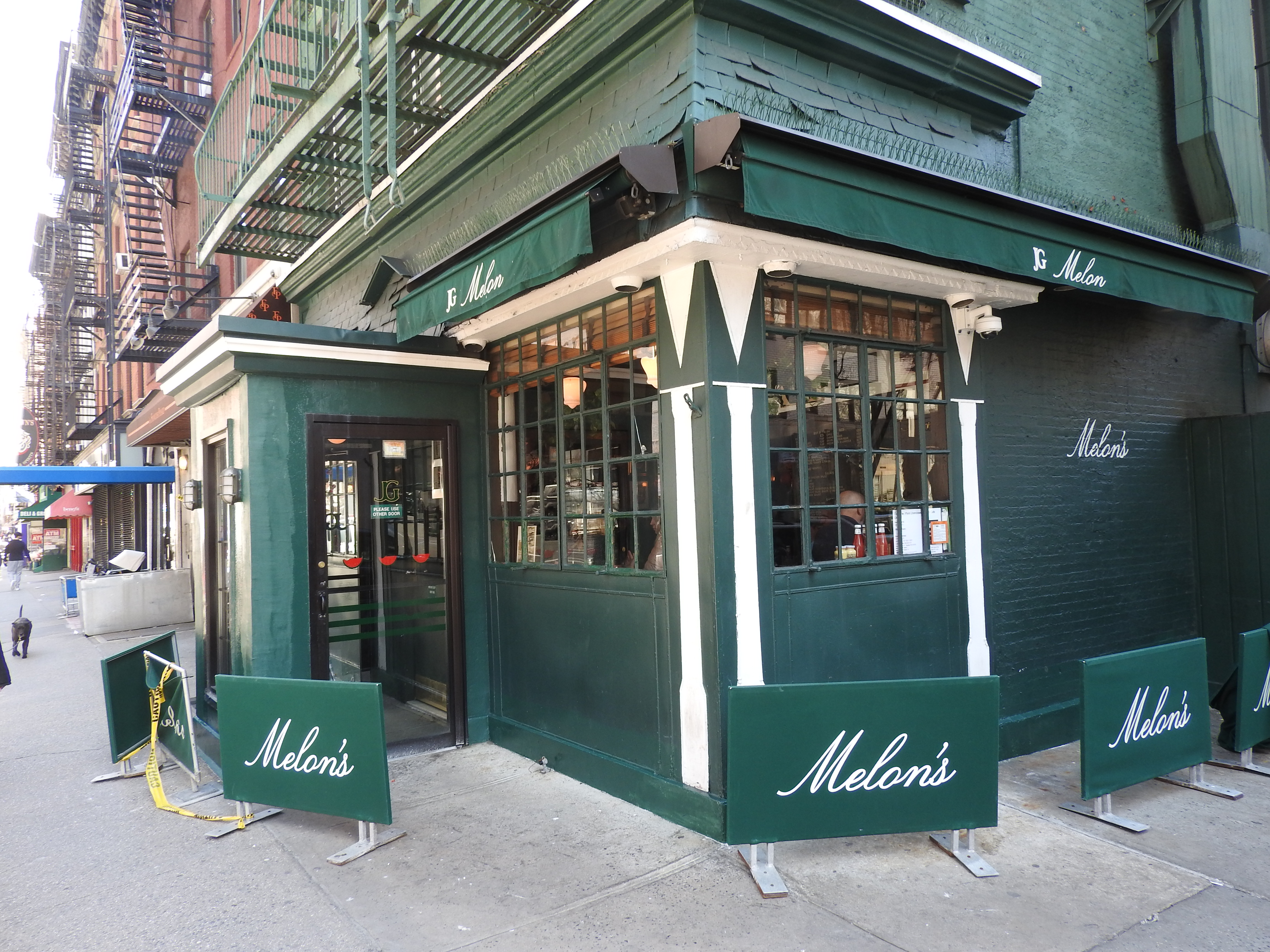
J.G. Melon

Hunter green is a color that is a representation of the color worn as camouflage by hunters in the 19th century. Most hunters began wearing the color olive drab instead of hunter green about the beginning of the 20th century.

The first recorded use of hunter green as a color name in English was in 1892.

Hunter green was one of the two official primary colors (along with white) of the New York Jets football team from 1998 to 2018. It has been one of the two official colors of Oswego State, and one of the two official colors of the Phi Kappa Psi fraternity. It is also one of the main colors of Deerfield Academy in Massachusetts.

Hunter green is one of the colors defined by the bandana code of the gay leather subculture. A hunter green bandana, if worn on the left, indicates that one is a "leather daddy", whereas if a hunter green bandana is worn on the right, it indicates that one is looking for a leather daddy (i.e., looking for a "daddy-boy" relationship).

Prison uniforms issued by the New York State Department of Corrections and Community Supervision are colored hunter green.

New York City since 2013 has used hunter green on its construction site fences and sidewalk sheds.

The J.G. Melon restaurant on the Upper East Side in New York City is in a brick tenement rowhouse painted hunter green.

=== India green ===
India green
- The Swaraj flag, officially adopted by the Indian National Congress in 1931

Color coordinates
- Hex triplet: #138808
- sRGB^{B} (r, g, b): (19, 136, 8)
- HSV (h, s, v): (115°, 94%, 53%)
- CIELCh_{uv} (L, C, h): (49, 74, 127°)
- Source: Vexillological
- ISCC–NBS descriptor: Deep yellowish green
- B: Normalized to [0–255] (byte)

India green, the color of the lower band of the national flag of India, represents fertility and prosperity. It originates with a flag proposed by Mahatma Gandhi, with green representing Islam and India saffron representing Hinduism.

=== Islamic green ===
Islamic green

Color coordinates
- Hex triplet: #009000
- sRGB^{B} (r, g, b): (0, 144, 0)
- HSV (h, s, v): (120°, 100%, 56%)
- CIELCh_{uv} (L, C, h): (52, 80, 128°)
- Source: Encycolorpedia
- ISCC–NBS descriptor: Vivid yellowish green
- B: Normalized to [0–255] (byte)

The color green (Arabic: أخضر) has a number of traditional associations in Islam. In the Quran, it is associated with Islamic paradise.

It was also chosen as a color by pro-Alid (Shi'a) factions. Thus in 817, when the Abbasid caliph al-Ma'mun adopted the Alid Ali al-Ridha, his heir-apparent, he also changed the dynastic color from black to green. The change was reverted when al-Ma'mun had Ali killed, and returned to Baghdad in 819. Green remains particularly popular in Shi'ite iconography, but it is also widely used by Sunni states. It is notably used in the flag of Saudi Arabia and flag of the Organisation of Islamic Cooperation.

=== MSU green ===
MSU green

Color coordinates
- Hex triplet: #18453B
- sRGB^{B} (r, g, b): (24, 69, 59)
- HSV (h, s, v): (167°, 65%, 27%)
- CIELCh_{uv} (L, C, h): (26, 18, 167°)
- Source: MSU Brand Guide
- ISCC–NBS descriptor: Very dark green
- B: Normalized to [0–255] (byte)

Green and white are the primary school colors representing Michigan State University. The university board of trustees officially standardized MSU green as part of a larger university branding effort, replacing a lighter green (PMS 341) used from 1997 to 2010. The official color was chosen based on the traditional darker Spartan green found on the original university varsity letter jackets and marching band jackets. The official green of Michigan State University is represented by Pantone Matching System ink color 567 (PMS 567).

=== NDHU green ===
NDHU green

Color coordinates
- Hex triplet: #0D5C33
- sRGB^{B} (r, g, b): (13, 92, 51)
- HSV (h, s, v): (149°, 86%, 36%)
- CIELCh_{uv} (L, C, h): (34, 37, 140°)
- Source: NDHU Brand Guide
- ISCC–NBS descriptor: Dark green
- B: Normalized to [0–255] (byte)

NDHU green is the official color of National Dong Hwa University, adopted in 1994. The university officially set NDHU green as part of a larger university branding effort. It represents the books, forest of knowledge, and its campus with nature-based setting.

=== Pakistan green ===
Pakistan green
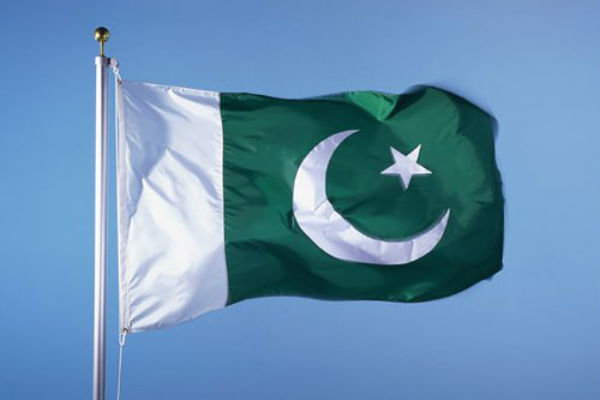

Color coordinates
- Hex triplet: #01411C
- sRGB^{B} (r, g, b): (1, 65, 28)
- HSV (h, s, v): (145°, 98%, 25%)
- CIELCh_{uv} (L, C, h): (23, 28, 137°)
- Source: Takhleeq
- ISCC–NBS descriptor: Deep yellowish green
- B: Normalized to [0–255] (byte)

Pakistan green is a shade of dark green, used in web development and graphic design. It originates with the field of green used on the flag of Pakistan, only stipulated as "dark green" in the national flag code. It is almost identical to the HTML/X11 dark green in sRGB and HSV values.

=== Persian green ===
Persian green

Color coordinates
- Hex triplet: #00A693
- sRGB^{B} (r, g, b): (0, 166, 147)
- HSV (h, s, v): (173°, 100%, 65%)
- CIELCh_{uv} (L, C, h): (61, 50, 174°)
- Source: ISCC-NBS
- ISCC–NBS descriptor: Brilliant bluish green
- B: Normalized to [0–255] (byte)

Persian green is a color used in Persian pottery and Persian carpets in Iran.

The first recorded use of Persian green as a color name in English was in 1892.

=== Pullman green ===
Pullman green
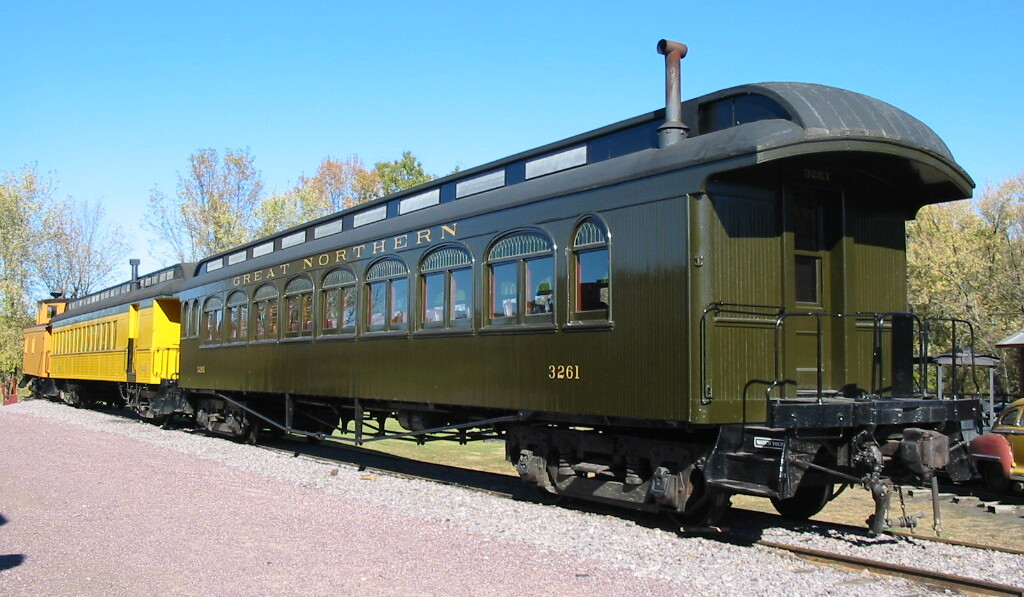
- A rail car painted Pullman green

Color coordinates
- Hex triplet: #3B331C
- sRGB^{B} (r, g, b): (59, 51, 28)
- HSV (h, s, v): (45°, 53%, 23%)
- CIELCh_{uv} (L, C, h): (22, 15, 68°)
- Source: The Official Register of Color Names
- ISCC–NBS descriptor: Dark grayish olive
- B: Normalized to [0–255] (byte)

Pullman green was a weather-resistant shade of green used by the Pullman Company for their rail cars, originally referred to as Brewster green. The color was often mimicked by contemporaries.

=== Rifle green ===
Rifle green

Color coordinates
- Hex triplet: #444C38
- sRGB^{B} (r, g, b): (68, 76, 56)
- HSV (h, s, v): (84°, 26%, 30%)
- CIELCh_{uv} (L, C, h): (31, 14, 105°)
- Source: Pantone TPX
- ISCC–NBS descriptor: Dark grayish olive green
- B: Normalized to [0–255] (byte)

The source of rifle green is the Pantone Textile Paper eXtended (TPX) color list, color No. 19-0419 TPX—Rifle green.

The first recorded use of rifle green as a color name in English was in 1858.

Rifle green is so named from the distinctive color of the uniform of rifle regiments (a form of light infantry) of a number of European armies, and is still used as such by rifle regiments in many Commonwealth armies, such as the Rifles and Royal Gurkha Rifles of the British Army and the Queen's Own Rifles of Canada.

Rifle green was originally adopted by rifle regiments in the 18th century, including the famous 95th Rifles of the Napoleonic Wars. As the traditional role of riflemen was that of marksmen and skirmishers who attacked behind the cover of trees, a dark green uniform was adopted as an early form of camouflage, as opposed to the colorful uniforms worn by other soldiers of the period. The vegetable based dyes used during the 18th and early 19th centuries were not fast, frequently fading after exposure to the elements to lighter shades of green or even brown. While this had advantages in terms of reduced visibility on active service, it did not make for a smart appearance on the peace-time parade ground. Accordingly, the color of the rifleman's uniform was progressively darkened until it approached black. After 1890 the development of chemical dyes permitted the adoption of the stable shade of rifle green now worn.

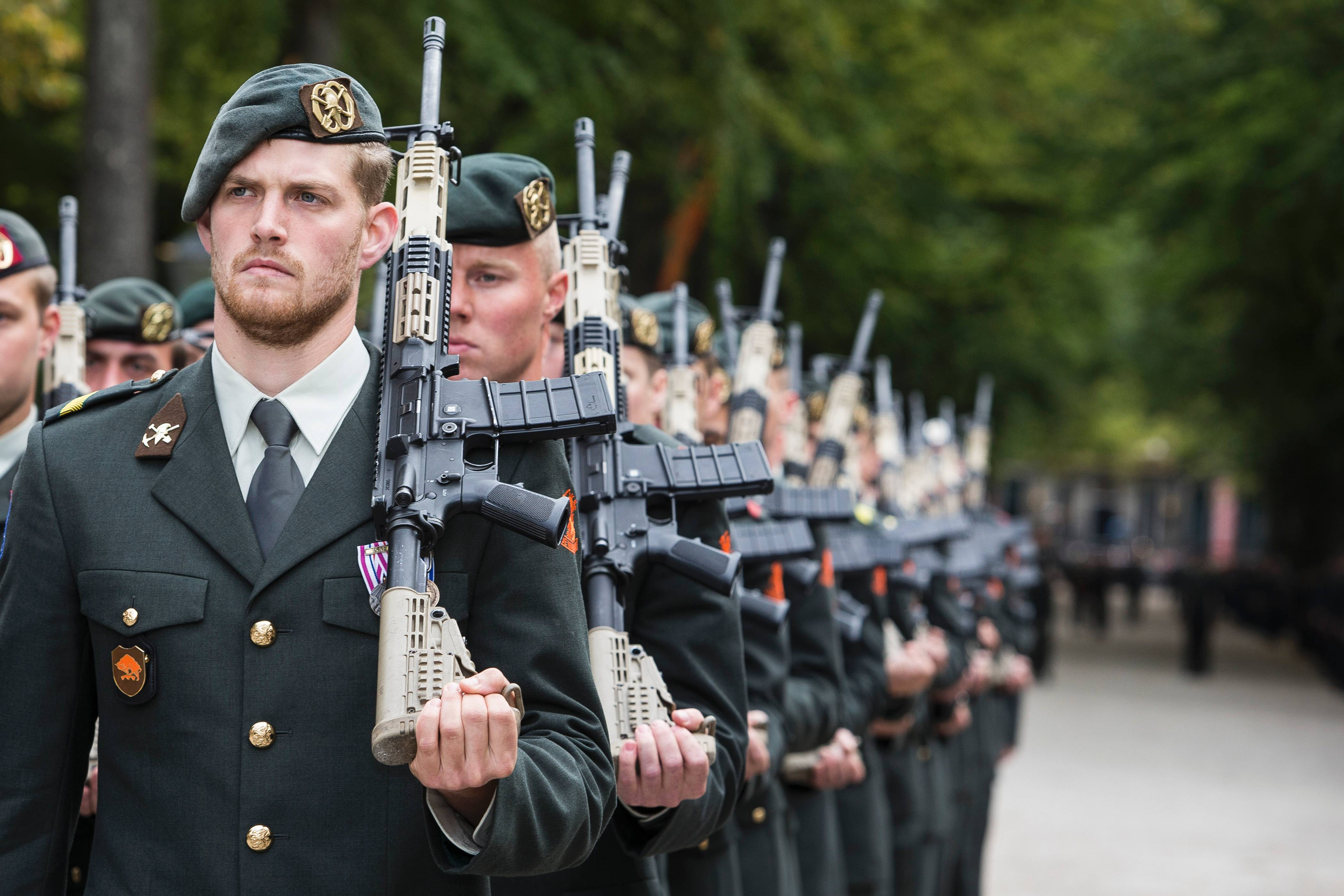
Dutch soldiers parading in rifle green uniforms

Rifle green was the official uniform colour of the Canadian Forces (CF) after unification; it was thereafter generally referred to as "CF green". After the introduction of the distinctive environmental uniform (DEU), rifle green remained as the uniform colour of the winter land environment DEU; a short-lived tan uniform was worn in summer. After the demise of the tans, the rifle green DEU was worn year-round. Rifle green was also the colour of the uniform worn by the Northern Irish Royal Ulster Constabulary (RUC) until 2001 where the RUC was renamed the PSNI and while the uniform color remained the same, terminology changed to "bottle green". In the U.S. armed forces, personnel qualified as special forces soldiers wear a green beret, which has given them their nickname. Rifle green uniforms were issued to Hiram Berdan's elite 1st and 2nd United States Sharpshooters during the American Civil War.

Rifle green is 19–0419 TPX in the Pantone palette, or hex code #444C38 in the sRGB color space, as shown above. Despite being referred to as bottle green in some contexts, Pantone rifle green is a distinct shade from RAL 6007 Bottle green.

=== Russian green ===
Russian green

Color coordinates
- Hex triplet: #679267
- sRGB^{B} (r, g, b): (103, 146, 103)
- HSV (h, s, v): (120°, 29%, 57%)
- CIELCh_{uv} (L, C, h): (57, 35, 128°)
- Source: ISCC-NBS
- ISCC–NBS descriptor: Moderate yellowish green
- B: Normalized to [0–255] (byte)

The first recorded use of Russian green as a color name in English was in the 1830s (exact year uncertain). The term appears to refer to the medium shade of green worn by most regiments of the Imperial Russian Army from 1700 to 1914.

=== SGBUS green ===
SGBUS green

Color coordinates
- Hex triplet: #55DD33
- sRGB^{B} (r, g, b): (85, 221, 51)
- HSV (h, s, v): (108°, 77%, 87%)
- CIELCh_{uv} (L, C, h): (78, 107, 125°)
- Source: HTML/CSS
- ISCC–NBS descriptor: Vivid yellowish green
- B: Normalized to [0–255] (byte)

SGBUS green is the color voted by the public and used by Singapore to color all its government-owned public buses.

=== Xbox green ===
Xbox green

Color coordinates
- Hex triplet: #0E7A0D
- sRGB^{B} (r, g, b): (14, 122, 13)
- HSV (h, s, v): (119°, 89%, 48%)
- CIELCh_{uv} (L, C, h): (44, 66, 128°)
- Source: The Official Register of Color Names
- ISCC–NBS descriptor: Deep yellowish green
- B: Normalized to [0–255] (byte)

Xbox green is the shade of green used for the Xbox branding.

== See also ==
- RAL 6001 Emerald green
- RAL 6005 Moss green
- RAL 6007 Bottle green
- Lists of colors
- Green pigments
