= Kuriyama =

Kuriyama may refer to:

== Surname ==
- Kuriyama (surname), Japanese surname

== Places ==
- Kuriyama, Hokkaidō, a town in Yūbari District, Sorachi, Hokkaidō, Japan
- Kuriyama, Tochigi, a village located in Shioya District, Tochigi, Japan

== Other uses ==
- Kuriyama Dam, a dam in Hokkaidō, Japan
- Kuriyama River, a river in Chiba Prefecture, Japan
