= Fotoflexer =

FotoFlexer is an online digital photo editing service that attempted to bring professional grade photo editing suites online for those without access to professionals or expensive software such as Photoshop. Fotoflexer provided image editing for MySpace and Photobucket. FotoFlexer received an 84 "very good" rating from PC World and is often compared with competitor Picnik.

== History ==
FotoFlexer was founded by Arbor Labs, a team of graduate students and alumni from the Center for Entrepreneurship and Technology, University of California at Berkeley, MIT, and Stanford University. The company’s offices are in Berkeley, California. Fotoflexer is led by CEO Sharam Shirazi. Shirazi has previously served as CEO of Empact Software Solutions, University Planet, Hyperstone electronics USA, and as CEO and Chairman of Teknekron Systems.
