= Kuriyama (surname) =

- Language: Japanese

Origin
- Meaning: chestnut mountain

Other names
- Variant form: 栗山

Kuriyama (栗山, lit. "chestnut mountain") is a Japanese surname.

== Notable people ==
- Anna Kuriyama (栗山 安奈; 1965–2014), Japanese actress
- Masashi Kuriyama (栗山 雅史; born 1988), Japanese volleyball player
- Chiaki Kuriyama (栗山 千明; born 1984), Japanese actress and model
- Takakazu Kuriyama (栗山 尚一; died 2015), former Japanese ambassador to the United States
- Takumi Kuriyama (栗山 巧; born 1983), Japanese Baseball player
- Cesar Kuriyama, Peru-born American entrepreneur
- Kenji03, real name Kenji Kuriyama (born 1984), Japanese musician best known as lead vocalist of Japanese band Back-On (also known as Hi-yunk)
