= Mike Harrington =

American businessman and video game designer (born 1964)

- Harrington in 2009
- Born: 1964 (age 61–62)
- Employer(s): Dynamix (1985–1987); Microsoft (1987–1996); Valve (1996–2000); Picnik (2005–2010); Google (2010–2011); Catnip Labs (2012–2015); Committee for Children (2016–2018); Amplion (2018–2020)
- Known for: Co-founding Valve
- Spouse: Monica Harrington (formerly)

Mike Harrington (born 1964) is an American programmer and businessman. With Gabe Newell, he is the co-founder of the video game company Valve. After the success of the first Valve game, Half-Life (1998), Harrington left Valve in 2000. In 2005, he co-founded the photo editing service Picnik.

== Career ==
Harrington was a programmer at the video game developer Dynamix and a designer on the Windows NT operating system at Microsoft. In 1996, he founded Valve with Gabe Newell, another former Microsoft employee. Harrington sold his Microsoft shares to fund his half of the startup. His wife at the time, Monica Harrington, was Valve's marketing strategist in its early years.

Harrington worked as a programmer on Valve's first game, Half-Life (1998), and funded its development with Newell. It was a critical and commercial success. Harrington said: "At Microsoft you always wonder, 'Is it me being successful or is it Microsoft?' But with Half-Life I knew Gabe and I had built that product and company from scratch." On January 15, 2000, Harrington sold his stake in Valve to Newell and left to spend time with his wife. According to Newell, Harrington did not want to risk another project after the success of Half-Life.

In 2006, Harrington co-founded the photo editing service Picnik with his friend and former colleague Darrin Massena. Picnik was acquired by Google in March 2010. Harrington left Google in March 2011. In January 2012, he co-founded another company with Massena, Catnip Labs. Harrington was CTO at the Committee for Children from 2016 to 2018, and CTO of Amplion from November 2018 until March 2020.
