= Jonathan Sposato =

American businessman (born 1967)

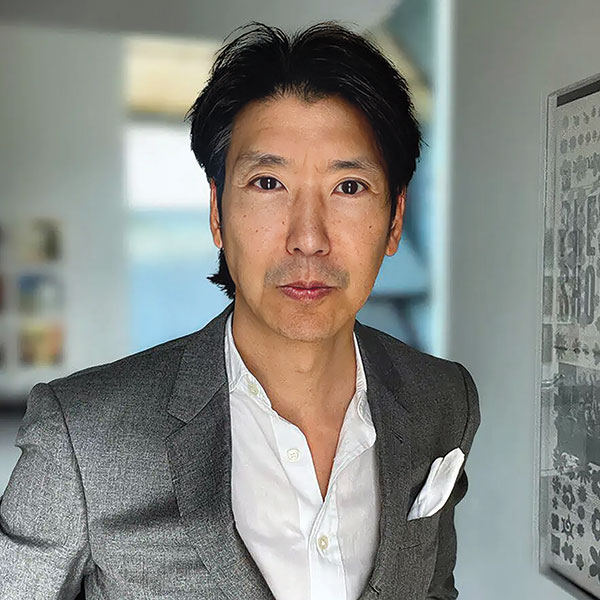
- Born: March 17, 1967 (age 59); London, England
- Occupation: entrepreneur

Jonathan Ng Sposato (pronounced SPŌ-sah-toe, born March 17, 1967) is an American serial entrepreneur, angel investor, and media executive known for his influential work in technology and media, as well as his advocacy for gender equality in business. Sposato is the chairman and co-founder of Geekwire, an American technology news website, and owns and publishes Seattle Magazine and Seattle Business Magazine. He is also the founder of JoySauce Network, a multimedia platform that promotes American Asian talent through podcasts, TV programs, and news.

Notably, Sposato was the first person to sell two profitable companies, Picnik and Phatbits, to Google., and in 2021, he successfully completed the sale of PicMonkey to Shutterstock. An investor in companies including Poppy, Pokitdok, EveryMove, and Vizify., he made a pledge to exclusively fund startups that include at least one female founder.

== Early life and education ==
Jonathan Sposato was born in London to a Chinese mother and a Korean father, who faced cultural barriers that prevented them from marrying in the 1960s. At the age of three, his mother moved with him to Brooklyn, New York. Due to the challenges of raising him as a single mother, she sent him to Hong Kong to live with his maternal grandparents.

When Sposato was nine, his mother remarried to Donald Sposato, an Italian American man who legally adopted Jonathan. This transition brought him to Seattle, where he experienced a sense of belonging and acceptance. Growing up in Edmonds, Washington during the 1970s, Sposato was often the only Asian American child in his community.

Sposato graduated from Whitman College in 1989 and serves on the Whitman College Board of Trustees.

== Career ==
=== Microsoft and early ventures ===
After graduating from Whitman College in 1989, Sposato founded his first games development company at age 22, which was later sold to Electronic Arts. In the early 1990s, Sposato held a senior management position within Microsoft's consumer division. He played a pivotal role in the strategic development of key Microsoft properties, directly presenting his insights to Chairman Bill Gates and the company's leadership. Additionally, Sposato was instrumental in the creation of the Xbox, the Xbox games business, and various MSN applications

=== Entrepreneurship and acquisitions ===
Sposato is recognized for being the first person to sell two profitable companies to Google: Picnik, an online photo editor reaching over 60 million visitors monthly and Phatbits, which became "Google Gadgets"

In 2021, he successfully sold PicMonkey, an online photo editing and design service, to Shutterstock.

== Current Ventures ==
=== JoySauce Network ===
Sposato is the Founder, CEO, and editor-in-chief of JoySauce Network, which launched in 2022. This multimedia platform promotes Asian American and Pacific Islander (AAPI) talent through various content including podcasts, TV programs, documentaries, stand-up comedy specials, and original editorial content.

In 2024, JoySauce won two Bronze Telly Awards for its contributions amplifying AAPI representation in media.

=== GeekWire ===
He is also the chairman and co-founder of GeekWire, a technology news website launched in 2011. Based in Seattle, GeekWire has become known for its content covering startups and established tech companies. Under Sposato's leadership, GeekWire has earned recognition as a go-to resource for breaking news and analysis in technology. .

=== Seattle Magazine and Seattle Business Magazine ===
In March 2020, Sposato acquired Seattle Magazine and Seattle Business Magazine, bringing ownership back to the Pacific Northwest after nearly 30 years under Tiger Oak Media.

- Seattle Magazine: Founded in 1966, it's a leading lifestyle publication highlighting Seattle's culture, dining, and events. Under Sposato's leadership, the magazine has renewed its focus on celebrating the city's character and fostering community engagement.
- Seattle Business Magazine: A key resource for business leaders in the Pacific Northwest, providing insights into economic trends, profiles of influential figures, and coverage of regional industry developments.

== Angel investing and advocacy ==
Jonathan Sposato's stance on gender equality in business garnered national attention when he declared in 2016 that he would only invest in startups with at least one female founder. This bold commitment was widely reported by major news outlets like CNN and GeekWire, emphasizing its significance within the U.S. investment community. His notable angel investments include Flavorcloud (formerly Runway2Street), Glamhive, and The Riveter.

== Philanthropy and social impact ==
Sposato has been involved in various philanthropic efforts. He is co-chair of United Way of King County's fundraising campaign and the founder of WeCount.org, a nonprofit focused on homelessness. An alumnus of Whitman College, he recently established an internship endowment to create pathways for students pursuing tech careers.

== Awards and recognition ==
- Inducted into the Asian Hall of Fame (2024)
- Bronze Telly Award for JoySauce Late Night (2024)
- "Man of Integrity Award" from the University of Washington (2017)
- Mayor's Innovation & Equity Award from the City of Seattle, Mayor's office (2017)
- Named one of Seattle's most influential people by Seattle Business Magazine (2015)
- Startup of the Year by Seattle 2.0 (2010)
- CEO of the Year by Seattle 2.0 (2010)
- Best Bootstrapped Startup by Seattle 2.0 (2010)

== Published works ==
Sposato is the author of Better Together: 8 Ways Working with Women Leads to Extraordinary Products and Profit, which became a national bestseller.

== Personal life ==
Sposato enjoys collecting "underdog" artifacts often overlooked by others, including works by lesser-known midcentury architects and vintage punk rocker jackets. He has discussed his collecting interests on the podcast The Collector's Gene Radio.
