= GeekWire =

Technology news website

- Website type: Technology news and analysis
- Owners: GeekWire, LLC
- Creators: Todd Bishop, John Cook
- Website: www.geekwire.com
- Commercial: Yes
- Registration: None
- Launched: March 7, 2011; 15 years ago
- Current status: Online

GeekWire is an American technology news website that covers startups and established technology companies. The site launched in March 2011 and is based in Seattle. It was founded by journalists Todd Bishop and John Cook with investment from Jonathan Sposato.

GeekWire founders John Cook and Todd Bishop were former technology reporters at the Seattle Post-Intelligencer and the Puget Sound Business Journal. Bishop and Cook joined the Puget Sound Business Journal to create TechFlash in September 2008, leaving to start GeekWire on March 7, 2011.

GeekWire is regularly featured on the Techmeme leaderboard as one of the sources most frequently posted to that site.
