= Picnik =

Photo editing service

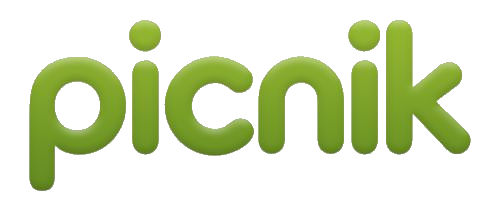
- Company type: Subsidiary
- Website type: Image editing service
- Available in: English, Spanish, German, Italian and 12 others
- Founded: 2005 in Seattle, Washington
- Dissolved: April 19, 2013
- Headquarters: Seattle, Washington, United States
- Key people: Jonathan Sposato, CEO; Darrin Massena, CTO and Co-founder; Mike Harrington, Co-founder
- Industry: Internet, computer software
- Parent: Google
- Website: www.picnik.com
- Current status: Fully closed

Picnik was an online photo editing service which was acquired by Google in 2010. It was headquartered in Downtown Seattle, Washington, United States.

The site allowed users to edit images, add styles to imported images and use basic editing tools such as cropping and resizing an image. Users could import photos natively from Facebook, Myspace, Picasa Web Albums, Flickr, Yahoo Image search, Google+ and also offered options to upload from a computer or to upload from a website. Many of Picnik's basic photo editing tools were free to use. Picnik Premium included additional photo editing features and was offered for a monthly, 6-month, or annual subscription cost.

Picnik had a partnership with Flickr that included a less feature-rich version of Picnik built into Flickr as a default photo editor. They had also signed up to do photo editing with free website creator Webs. Picnik was acquired by Google on March 1, 2010.

In January 2012, Picnik announced that it would be closing on April 19, 2013 and would be moving their tools to Google+. They provided a full refund to all Premium members and also provided free Premium service to everyone until April 19. Some people petitioned to stop the shut down, but failed. Picnik sent an email to all of their users on March 21, 2012 containing a list of frequently asked questions.

Picnik stopped allowing downloads of saved content and fully shut down on April 19, 2013. Two of Picnik's original engineers left Google to start a similar photo editor called PicMonkey in the beginning of 2012.
