= Cesar Kuriyama =

American director and speaker

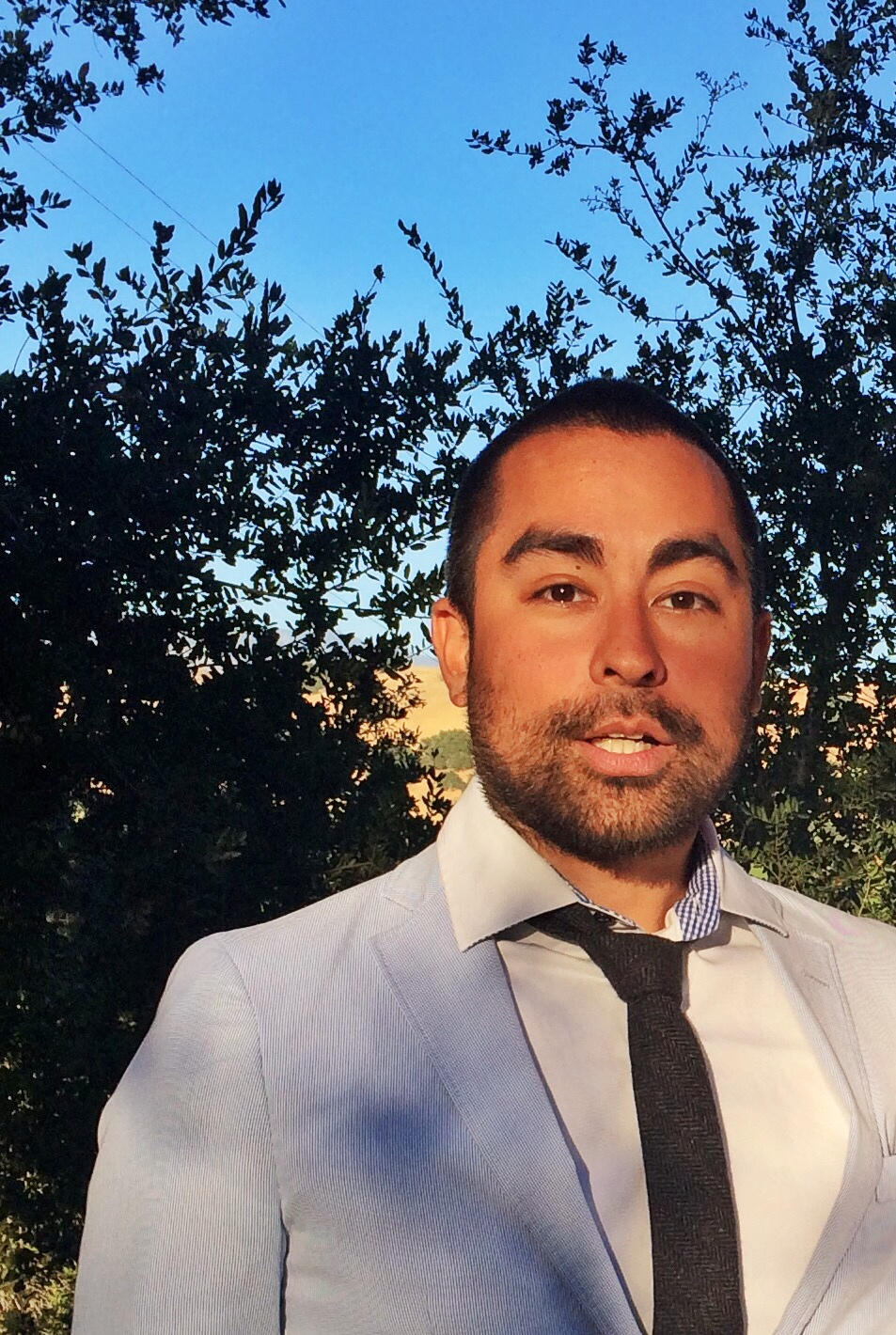
- Born: Lima, Peru
- Known for: 1 Second Everyday
- Website: cesarkuriyama.com

Cesar Kuriyama is an American director, entrepreneur and speaker. He is most known for founding the company 1 Second Everyday Inc., which developed the application 1 Second Everyday, which allows the user to record one second of video every day and then chronologically edits (mashes) them together into a single film. He has taught courses in animation at NYU, Harvard University and Pratt Institute.

== Early life and education ==
Kuriyama was born in Lima, Peru and raised in New Jersey. He went to Pratt Institute in Brooklyn and studied computer animation and spent his extra-curricular time learning other pieces of art that interested him, like film, photography and graphic design.

== Career ==
After graduating from school, he held various jobs in the advertising industry. One day he was watching Stefan Sagmeister's talk on "The power of time off," and he was inspired to take some time off from work as well. He started saving money and two years later, in 2011, he left his job and started traveling around the US and Canada. During that time he started working on a project called 1 Second Everyday. The idea of the project was that he would record one second of video every day to help him remember that day. He started the project because he felt he had had a bad memory and was frustrated he couldn't remember the day to day of his 20s. At the end of the year, he had a 365 second long clip, which went viral. The video garnered him a lot of media coverage. Kuriyama, then decided to continue the project as it did not just help him remember every day, but also put his life into perspective.

In April 2011, TED started holding TED talk auditions for the first time. After seeing the opportunity, Kuriyama applied and sent a one-minute video to them. He was selected for a live audition and subsequent to that audition; he was invited by TED for TED 2012. After the TED talk, Kuriyama decided to launch an application that would help other people record a second of their day every day. In order to collect the funds for the application, he launched a Kickstarter project, which was successful. As of 2015, his Kickstarter project was the most backed mobile application project on the website. Later, his TED talk was made public and it became TED talk of the day. In 2012, Kuriyama directed the video of Long Gone by Fat City Reprise. In order to make the video, he took 45,000 photographs and stitched them together to create the illusion of a video. The video was premiered at their homecoming concert in Philadelphia. Including the time for conceptualizing and creating the storyboard, it took Kuriyama about 14 months to make the video. Reviewing the video, Wired wrote that Kuriyama "has directed a visually arresting music video using an interesting technique." The video was featured as one of “The Best Visual Artist-Directed Music Videos of All Time” in Complex magazine.

When Kuriyama saw Iron Man 3, he was impressed by Jon Favreau, who did not direct the third movie but did come back to play his role. Kuriyama felt that Favreau was not being appreciated enough so he wrote a tweet and sent it to Favreau. Favreau read the tweet and saw Kuriyama TED talk and the application. He then emailed Kuriyama to ask him about using 1 Second Everyday in his movie Chef. Kuriyama agreed and the application became a part of the plot of the movie.
