= PicMonkey =

Online photo editing and design service

PicMonkey LLC

- Company type: Private
- Website type: Image editing service
- Available in: English
- Founded: 2012 in Seattle, Washington
- Headquarters: Seattle, Washington, United States
- Key people: Frits Habermann, CEO; Jonathan Sposato; Brian Terry; Justin Huff; Charlie Whiton; Lisa Conquergood
- Industry: Internet, computer software
- Website: www.picmonkey.com
- Advertising: Yes
- Registration: Yes
- Launched: March 1, 2012; 14 years ago
- Current status: Active

PicMonkey is an online photo editing and design service that can be accessed from a web browser, or through a mobile app. The company behind the service is headquartered in downtown Seattle, Washington.

== Features ==
PicMonkey offers graphic design and photo editing tools, as well as design templates for wedding invitations, announcements, thank you cards, business cards, etc. While free users can access most of the tools and features on the site, a membership is needed for the full design and photo editing workflow, which includes saving, sharing to social accounts like Facebook, YouTube, Instagram, and Twitter, and access to PicMonkey's integrated cloud storage option. PicMonkey has been redeveloped and its old version can no longer be accessed due to Adobe Flash sunsetting.

As of 2023, on the PicMonkey website and mobile app, the key features are: Photo editor, Design tools, Touch up, Facebook design, Instagram design, Youtube design, Templates, Graphics, and Branding. These added features to photos and graphic designs can easily be downloaded and shared/exported out to others.

PicMonkey has an open API for developers to integrate its tools directly into a website. Some current API partners include Facebook, Ipernity, and SmugMug. PicMonkey's affiliate partner is ShareaSale.

== History ==
PicMonkey was founded by former Picnik employees Brian Terry, Justin Huff, Charlie Whiton, and Lisa Conquergood, with financial support from former Picnik CEO Jonathan Sposato. Picnik was a popular online photo editor that had been acquired by Google in 2010, but was shut down in January 2012. Terry, Huff, Sposato and others saw this as an opportunity to create a new company, PicMonkey, which was founded in April 2012 with the stated aim of creating a "fast and lightweight" photo editing experience.

PicMonkey was recognized as a Top 100 Website in 2013 by PC Magazine, listed as hosting one of the Best April Fools' Pranks of 2014 by TIME Magazine, and recognized as one of the most affordable online services for startups.

By February 2014, PicMonkey had become profitable, and had grown to over 13 million unique monthly users. In July 2015, the company received a $41 million investment from the growth equity firm Spectrum Equity.

On September 2, 2015, Frits Habermann joined PicMonkey as Chief Technology Officer. Habermann had formerly worked as vice president of core technologies at Adobe, and as the CTO of PopCap Games. In 2017, Habermann was appointed as the new PicMonkey CEO. Former CEO Jonathan Sposato continued on the PicMonkey board of directors as the chairman.

In 2018, PicMonkey did away with the Adobe Flash Player plug-in for web browsers. In 2019, the service launched a collaborative image editing feature. In 2020, PicMonkey began supporting video editing.

On September 7, 2021, PicMonkey was acquired by Shutterstock in a $110M cash deal. This has resulted in the stock photo options, which was originally provided by PicMonkey, now being shifted and provided by Shuttershock.
