= Ravenholm =

Fictional ghost town in Half-Life 2

- Half-Life location
- Ravenholm, as seen from high above the town
- First appearance: Half-Life 2 (2004)
- Genre: First-person shooter

In-universe information
- Type: Ghost town
- Character: Grigori
- Population: 1

Ravenholm is a fictional ghost town in the 2004 first-person shooter game Half-Life 2 created by Valve. It is the setting for the game's sixth chapter, "We Don't Go To Ravenholm...", which follows protagonist Gordon Freeman as he journeys through the area after escaping a Combine attack in order to reach a nearby Resistance outpost. An Eastern European mining town, Ravenholm's residents have turned into hostile zombies due to Combine attacks. The town's sole survivor, Father Grigori, offers his assistance to Freeman throughout the level, culminating in a last stand at the town cemetery.

The level received critical praise due to its level design and unexpected usage of horror aspects involving headcrabs and zombies, with some critics calling it one of the most well-designed levels in a Valve game and one of the best first-person shooter levels ever made. Due to its popularity, Valve initially contracted Junction Point Studios to make a prequel featuring the town, a project that later became a spinoff game developed by Arkane Studios that further followed the story of Grigori and his fight against the Combine. However, both projects were ultimately cancelled partway through development.

== Plot ==
Prior to the Combine invasion, Ravenholm was a small mining town in Eastern Europe. The town served as an outpost for the Resistance against the Combine occupation. The Combine eventually bombarded the town with artillery shells containing headcrabs, alien parasites which attack organisms and turn them into zombies. Ravenholm's entire population was zombified, which led the Resistance to abandon the town.

Shortly before the level, companion Alyx Vance states to protagonist Gordon Freeman, whom the player controls, that "we don't go [to Ravenholm] anymore", foreshadowing its overrun nature. The Resistance base, Black Mesa East, is attacked by Combine forces after the player obtains the Gravity Gun. Alyx's pet robot Dog opens a door to a tunnel leading to Ravenholm, directing the player to the town's outskirts.

When the player first enters the ghost town in "We Don't Go To Ravenholm...", the soundtrack shifts to a traditional horror score, and the level contains a pair of disembodied legs hanging from a tree before discovering the town is infested with headcrabs and zombies. New enemies are introduced in the level, including poison headcrabs that can set the player's health to one point before it gradually regenerates. Fast zombies and headcrabs are quicker than their counterparts. Fast zombies can climb drainage pipes. Poisonous zombies are slow but have large amounts of health and carry poison headcrabs on their back that they can throw at the player.

The town is littered with traps the player can utilize to kill zombies, built by the town's lone inhabitant, Father Grigori. The player follows him to the town's warehouse district; Grigori gives the player a shotgun and directs him to a cemetery. Grigori helps the player enter a nearby crypt, holding off incoming zombies in a last stand. The player continues on through a series of mines, escaping via a railway network to reach Shorepoint, a Resistance outpost.

== Development ==
Concept art of Ravenholm, depicting a zombie tossing a metal barrel at the player. Debris is visible in the background.

The level was initially called "Traptown" or "phystown" in the game's files during an early E3 demo of Half-Life 2, referencing the numerous booby traps scattered through it. Datamined information by fans showed that an early build featured Combine forces in the level in addition to headcrabs and zombies, and the "mining town" aspect of Ravenholm was much more prominent, including allowing the player to control a large excavator. The original version of Ravenholm may have also been set chronologically before the player arrived at Black Mesa East and acquired the gravity gun. The weapon ultimately ended up defining the level, encouraging the player to kill zombies using saw blades and other tools as an alternative to using the player's weapons. Players who possessed shared knowledge of zombie-based fiction such as The Zombie Survival Guide could also instinctively guess that the objects able to be picked up by the gravity gun could be used in an offensive manner.

Level designer Dario Casali stated that Ravenholm was conceived as a "sanctuary gone bad", where the player went expecting help from potential allies, but realized they had all turned into enemies. Casali further stated that the town was designed to both appear isolated to the point where it could have believably escaped Combine notice for a time while simultaneously match the game's other levels, describing this as a challenge. The level's designers initially created the traps in Ravenholm using "simple geometric shapes", before turning to concept artists to transform the ideas into more detailed and realistic concepts.

It is generally believed by fans and critics that Ravenholm was partially inspired by a level of the 1998 video game Thief: The Dark Project known as the "Sealed Section", as Marc Laidlaw, who wrote the plot of Half-Life 2, was personally a fan of the game. In the level, the player traverses through a quarter of a large city which has become infested by the undead, which stands in contrast to the technologically advanced neighbourhoods surrounding it. However, unlike the Thief level, the player has not yet encountered overt horror tropes in Half-Life 2 prior to arriving at Ravenholm.

=== Cancelled projects ===
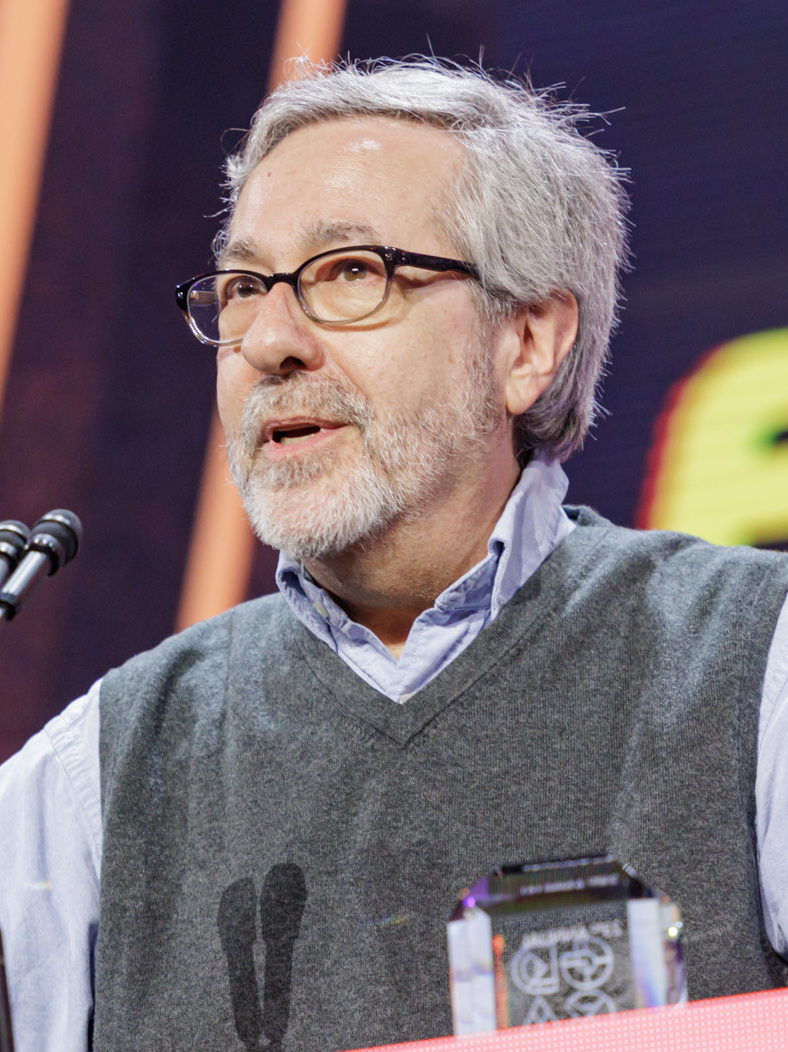
Warren Spector, who worked on a cancelled Half-Life game set in Ravenholm

Between 2005 and 2007, a Half-Life prequel was in development by Junction Point Studios, with a team led by Warren Spector. The game's plot was intended to explain the backstory behind both Ravenholm and Grigori, showing how it was attacked by the Combine and Grigori's actions prior to the player meeting him in Half-Life 2. It would have included a "magnet gun" which could attract metal objects from remote locations using metallic ball-shaped projectiles. In mid-2007, the project was cancelled and the studio went on to develop the platformer video game Epic Mickey instead, releasing it in 2010.

The concept was later given to Arkane Studios, who changed it into a spinoff Half-Life game titled Ravenholm set entirely in the town, but was cancelled by Valve after "9 or 10" levels had already been completed. It was intended to feature Adrian Shephard, the protagonist of Half-Life: Opposing Force, as he made his way through the town with the help of Grigori. Grigori, revealed to have survived his last stand in Half-Life 2, would have gradually mutated into an inhuman being as the result of a serum created from headcrab blood that he believed would protect him from harm.

The game would also have introduced several new weapons, such as a nail gun, which could power up doors by acting as an electrical conductor, a plasma weapon and a weaponized leaf blower that could be used to double jump. Laidlaw stated that reasons behind the cancellation included the fact that headcrabs and zombies "were pretty much played out at the time", and that the fact that it had to take place chronologically prior to Half-Life 2: Episode Two was too creatively constraining. Footage of the project was shown in a 2020 documentary by media company Noclip titled The Untold History of Arkane.

== Reception ==
The level's originality and tonal shift caused it to stand out to critics. GamesRadar+ journalist Alex Avard praised "We Don't Go To Ravenholm..." as an example of a horror sequence in a non-horror game, describing it as "harrowing" and a "blood-soaked frightfest". Fellow GamesRadar+ journalist Ashley Reed praised the game's inclusion of "Zombie Chopper", an achievement which forced the player to beat the entire level employing only the Gravity Gun, arguing that not using weapons forced them to think creatively about how to proceed through the level, turning to items such as saw blades as improvised weaponry and employing strategies such as fleeing the zombies before they could notice the character's presence.

The level was also praised for its effective use of horror elements. Den of Geek journalist Matthew Byrd described Ravenholm as "the perfect horror level", stating that it both served as a send up of horror tropes and effectively utilized them to scare the player. Suggesting that it "just happened to be the perfect idea released at the perfect time", Byrd further stated that some elements of the level "certainly don't feel quite as groundbreaking" 15 years later as they did upon the game's release. PC Gamer journalist Andy Kelly included the game on the list of his best first-person shooter levels ever, calling it "a tense, terrifying gauntlet" and "probably the best level Valve has ever designed". Screen Rant journalist Padraig Cotter argued that the level was "arguably the game's most famous" and had a "perfect balance" of horror and action. Describing the town's atmosphere as "oppressive", he noted that the level's incidental details, such as bodies and gore, told a "powerful story", saying that it was "hard not to feel sorry" for the unwillingly transformed zombies. Polygon writer Jenna Stoeber called Ravenholm an example of Valve's best level design techniques, praising its strong core narrative idea and the fact that the player comes across the level in medias res. USgamer journalist Jeremy Parish stated that Ravenholm "makes great use of audio cues to build tension", noting how the player can hear poison headcrabs before they see them.

== See also ==
- Half-Life 2: Lost Coast
