= Half-Life: Escape from City 17 =

- Title card
- Directed by: David Purchase; Ian Purchase
- Screenplay by: David Purchase
- Based on: Half-Life 2 by Valve
- Distributed by: YouTube
- Release dates: February 13, 2009 (Part One); August 24, 2011 (Part Two)
- Running time: Part One – 3:53; Part Two – 14:28
- Country: Canada
- Language: English
- Budget: $500

Half-Life: Escape from City 17 is a two-part Canadian short film written, developed, and filmed by the Purchase Brothers. The film is set in the Half-Life universe, during the events of Half-Life 2 and Half-Life 2: Episode One. Both films were critically acclaimed. Part One was released on February 13, 2009; and Part Two was released on August 24, 2011.

== Synopsis ==
=== Part One ===
Part One is set during the second half of events of Half-Life 2: Episode One. Dr. Isaac Kleiner is making his "Kleinercasts" on City 17's PA system, warning that the Combine Citadel is set to explode at any moment; should the Citadel detonate, the resulting explosion will destroy the city and the surrounding area. Prior to the film's events, Gordon Freeman's actions within the Citadel have held down the impending explosion, opening a small window of time for civilians to escape. Members of the Lambda Resistance are seen fighting their way out of the city as the Combine's Civil Protection forces try to hold them back. CP officers are also seen executing captured rebels, while Combine synths wreak havoc on the warzone.

Two male Resistance members (Derek Chan and Ian Purchase) are introduced escaping through an overrun trainyard. Through radio communication, the two learn from a third rebel (David Purchase) that the last evacuation train has already left, and are urged to escape the city on foot through the canal system (a route similar to that of Gordon Freeman's in Half-Life 2) in order to catch up with David, who is en route to the Resistance stronghold of White Forest. After a brief argument, the two resolve to escape City 17 before "the Citadel blows us up first".

Suddenly, CP officers appear and fire on the Resistance members. The two retaliate with their own weaponry (Derek using a 9mm pistol, then a crowbar found hanging on a handrail; Ian using an SMG with a grenade launcher) and manage to escape. They are eventually caught upon an open stretch of railway, where a Hunter-Chopper appears and fires at them, giving chase. The duo disappear behind a cloud of dirt from the wake of the chopper's mounted gun, and the film abruptly cuts to black.

=== Part Two ===
Part Two begins some time before Part One, taking place somewhere before the chapter Anticitizen One during the final events of Half-Life 2. During the battle for City 17, a Russian Resistance member (Julia Tourianski) is about to be killed by CP officers when the third Resistance member (David Purchase), who was only heard in a radio transmission during Part One, saves her by killing the officers. At first, she doesn't trust him, but after partnering up together to survive the battle, they become closer to each other. At one point in the film, they kiss in an abandoned restroom after destroying a Combine Strider. Sometime later, David gives Julia a present: a 9mm pistol with the slogan "Never Gone" written on the side. She starts to weep, because she hadn't been "given a gift in over a decade."

Soon after, the final events of Half-Life 2, as well as the chapters Undue Alarm and Direct Intervention of Episode One, come to pass, and the Citadel's dark energy reactor begins to enter meltdown. However, Gordon Freeman's actions delay the reaction long enough to allow citizens and Resistance members alike to escape City 17. David and Julia decide to leave the city as well. After reaching the old canals and combating zombies, the first two Resistance members from Part One, Derek and Ian, finally catch up with the duo. As they walk together, they talk about Freeman's actions within the Citadel. Suddenly, David is shot in the neck by a CP officer. As the other two members fire back at the incoming Combine soldiers, David dies in Julia's arms. Anguished, she and the others are forced to run, as a dropship, CP officers, and an Overwatch soldier chase after them. They are able to lose them, escaping into an old canal tunnel.

As they try to catch their breath within the tunnel, Julia is suddenly attacked by a headcrab. Ian and Derek try to get it off of her head, but when another horde of zombies appear, they are forced to fend them off instead. At that point, the Citadel's dark energy core explodes. City 17 is decimated to rubble, and the blinding blue light from the explosion fills the tunnel from a skylight in the roof. Flashbacks from previous events suddenly appear among the beams of light, recalling when David had given Julia the pistol.

The scene returns to Julia, who pulls out the pistol, reloads it, and shoots the headcrab off of her. Derek helps her to her feet, and the three of them run for the tunnel exit as the film ends.

== Production ==
=== Part One ===
The first part of the film was created by Toronto-based David and Ian Purchase, the two of whom are collectively referred to as the Purchase Brothers. Before Escape from City 17, the Purchase Brothers had directed several commercials, including one for Coca-Cola. David contended that they worked as commercial directors in order to support their independent projects. Both being fans of the Half-Life series, the two decided to start Escape from City 17 as a way "to showcase and promote their talents further, and experiment with several post-production techniques they had developed."

The two had a budget of Can$500; the computer equipment and software employed for the development of the film belonged to the Purchase Brothers from previous projects. According to David, the money was spent on the live-action elements of the film, saying that "the costumes, and used/broken airsoft guns made up the bulk of the budget." The two had no crew to support them, and were not paid for their work. Many of the elements of the film, such as the background, the Citadel, and the gunships, were extracted from Half-Life 2. The elements were then "graphically enhanced, and incorporated into the live action with a lot of complicated tracking and rotoscoping." The background used for the film's opening scene is the panorama of Riga.

The "main set" of Part One was filmed at a trainyard with "active security." This made filming the short difficult, as the Purchase Brothers "tend not to get permits" to use the trainyard for the film. They only found out about the security once they'd started filming. The three people involved – David, Ian, and Derek Chan – were chased out multiple times by guards on ATVs.

=== Part Two ===
The Purchase Brothers had initially planned to release the second part of the film in early to mid-March 2009, but the large number of emails and phone calls the two received regarding the first part slowed development of the second. According to teaser clips at the end of the first part, the two Resistance soldiers will be joined by two additional characters, one of them a heroine, and will come into contact with headcrab zombies. The Purchase Brothers cited on their YouTube profile page that a new secret film project has heavily hampered their progress in completing Part Two, although it would be released in the near future.

Another teaser clip was released on YouTube on October 13, 2009.

Part Two was released on YouTube on August 19, 2011. The clip was quickly removed for unknown reasons by the end of the same day with no further comment on why it was removed. It was re-uploaded on August 24, 2011.

=== Part Three ===
A third part was filmed by the Purchase Brothers. A fundraising campaign was held via Indiegogo in order to fund the film's special effects, but failed to meet its goal.

On August 23, 2013, a teaser for Escape from City 17: Part Three was released.

== Release ==
The backgrounds of City 17 were created using photographs of Riga. These were combined with computer generated imagery for war damage and structures like the Citadel, seen here.

Upon the film's release to YouTube it garnered thousands of views very quickly, but the film's exposure was skyrocketed when Valve, developers of the Half-Life series, promoted it with a news post on Steam. It was quickly featured on many popular gaming news websites and had surpassed 1 million views within two days of release. As of 2 October 2013, parts one and two have 5 million and 1.1 million views on YouTube respectively.

== Reception ==
Regarding the first part of the film, Barry White of Citizen Game commented, "Considering the comparatively paltry resources [...] at [the Purchase Brothers] disposal this short still manages to be better than every video game movie currently in existence." Wagner Au of NewTeeVee contended that the first part "is one of those rare viral videos that seems destined to launch a breakout success", and added "non-gamers are likely to be impressed by its rollicking action and bravura special effects." Au believed its popularity was due, in part, to the fact that the video is adapted from Half-Life 2. Patrick Goss, writing for TechRadar, said the in-game footage from the Half-Life 2 series "blended almost seamlessly into [the] live action footage" in the film.

Valve, developers of the Half-Life series, approved of the film and publicized it in an announcement on Steam, saying "we were blown away – the production quality certainly exceeds that of the usual community-made movies we see."
