= Half-Life 2: Lost Coast =

2005 video game

- Developer: Valve
- Publisher: Valve
- Series: Half-Life
- Engine: Source
- Platforms: Windows; OS X; Linux
- Release: Windows; October 27, 2005; OS X, Linux; June 28, 2013
- Genre: First-person shooter
- Mode: Single-player

Half-Life 2: Lost Coast is an additional level for the 2004 first-person shooter game Half-Life 2. Developed by Valve, it was released on October 27, 2005, as a free download for owners of Half-Life 2 on Steam. Players control Half-Life protagonist Gordon Freeman as he travels up a coastal cliff to destroy a Combine weapon in a monastery.

Lost Coast is a technology demonstration showcasing the high-dynamic-range rendering implemented in the Source engine. It was designed with environments to emphasize these effects. Lost Coast was the first Valve game with a commentary mode, in which the developers explain elements of design as the player progresses through the level.

The Lost Coast level was created for Half-Life 2, but was removed from the game. It was originally going to be a level in "Highway 17" where Gordon ends up in a strange place meeting a Fisherman. As a result, it has several minor story details that were not included in Half-Life 2. It received a generally positive reception, and there was consensus among reviewers that the new features included in Lost Coast should be integrated into future games released by Valve.

== Gameplay ==
Lost Coast uses the same first-person shooter gameplay as Half-Life 2. The player is equipped with weapons from Half-Life 2, including the object-manipulating gravity gun.

The chancel of the Byzantine Christian church in Lost Coast, which Valve artist Viktor Antonov called a "great showcase for HDR"

Like Half-Life 2, the player controls Gordon Freeman. Freeman must enter a monastery that enemy Combine are using to launch heavy artillery shells into a seaside town. The player encounters Combine soldiers and headcrabs before disabling the artillery launcher and destroying an attack helicopter with RPGs. A fisherman congratulates him and Gordon teleports away.

== Development ==
=== Level design ===
Lost Coast was conceived as a part of the Highway 17 chapter in Half-Life 2 (Highway 17's development name was "Coast", hence the name "Lost Coast"), but was discarded during development. It features storyline details that were removed from Half-Life 2, such as the headcrab artillery launchers.

Each area was designed with a specific purpose. An Eastern Orthodox architectural style was chosen for the monastery, as buildings of this type "are very colorful and have a large variety of materials" and are "often lit naturally, with extremes of darkness and brightness", providing an ideal showcase for the HDR lighting effects. Valve also thought a monastery would provide a starker contrast between old human architecture and futuristic Combine technology inside it.

The cliffside that leads to the monastery had a gameplay-oriented purpose, and was meant to emulate a similar cliffside combat scene in the original Half-Life (1998). The cliffside also forces the player to be observant of threats from above and below, breaking from normal horizontal combat. The monastery's courtyard was designed as an area where the player recovers from the cliffside combat, while also presenting a contained combat arena later in the level in which the player must hold their ground while they are attacked from multiple directions.

=== High-dynamic-range rendering ===
A comparison of standard fixed-aperture rendering (left) with HDR rendering (right) in the Source engine

The goal of Lost Coast was to demonstrate the new high-dynamic-range rendering implemented into the Source game engine. Valve first attempted to implement high-dynamic-range rendering in Source in late 2003. The first method stored textures in RGBA color space, allowing for multisample anti-aliasing and pixel shaders to be used, but this prevented alpha mapping and fog effects from working correctly, as well as making textures appear sharp and jagged. The second method involved saving two versions of a texture: one with regular data, and the other with overbrightening data. However, this technique did not allow for multisample anti-aliasing and consumed twice as much video card memory, making it infeasible. The third method, shown at the E3 convention in 2005, used floating-point data to define the RGB color space, allowing for reasonably efficient storage of the high-dynamic-range data. However, this method also did not allow for multisample anti-aliasing, and was only compatible with Nvidia video cards, leaving ATI cards unable to run high dynamic range. The fourth and final method compromised between the second and third methods, using overbrightening textures sparingly and allowing ATI cards to render HDR in a different way from the Nvidia ones while nearly producing the same result.

The final version of Valve's high-dynamic-range technology adds a significant number of lighting effects to the engine, aimed at making the game appear more realistic. Bloom shading was introduced, blurring bright edges in the game world and emulating a camera's overexposure to light. This is combined with exposure control to tailor the effect to represent the human eye. For example, as the player exits a dark area into a light area, the new area is initially glaringly bright, but quickly darkens, representing the adjustment of the player character's eyes to the light. New cube mapping techniques allow the reflection cast by an object to correspond with the brightness of the light source, and lightmaps enable light bouncing and global illumination to be taken into account in the rendering. Refraction effects were added to make light account for the physical attributes of an object and to emulate the way light is reflected by water. The Lost Coast level is specifically designed to showcase these effects. It uses the sea and beach as opportunities to demonstrate water-based effects, the monastery to demonstrate bloom from its whitewash walls, and the sanctuary to provide the means to show refraction through stained glass windows and cube maps on golden urns and candlesticks.

As a technology showcase, Valve considered Lost Coast to have very demanding system requirements. The game runs on computers with specifications lower than what is recommended, albeit without some key features such as high dynamic range. If a non-high-dynamic-range-capable card is used, the developer commentary is changed slightly to reflect this. For example, Valve president Gabe Newell would describe the effects that are seen differently.

=== Commentary system ===
In addition to a showcase for visual improvements, Lost Coast acted as a testbed for Valve's commentary system. When the feature is enabled, speech bubbles appear in the game that can be interacted with to play audio commentary. Each audio piece ranges from ten seconds to a minute of commentary. Players hear the developers talk about what the player is seeing, what is happening, why they made certain decisions, and what kinds of challenges they faced. Commentary tracks are represented by floating speech bubbles called commentary nodes. Valve intended for players to first play the level with commentary disabled, and after completing the level, play it again with commentary enabled, learning about each new stage as they progress. Valve included the commentary system in later games. The commentary system was implemented in Half-Life 2 in late 2024 as a part of the 20th anniversary update.

== Release ==
Lost Coast was released on October 27, 2005, as a free download for owners of Half-Life 2 on Steam. Valve announced on May 30, 2007, that Lost Coast, along with Half-Life 2: Deathmatch, would be made available for free to owners of ATI Radeon cards. It was later released without charge to Nvidia graphics card owners along with Half-Life 2: Deathmatch, Peggle Extreme, and the first eleven levels of Portal. In 2024, the 20th anniversary of Half-Life 2, Valve updated Half-Life 2 to incorporate Lost Coast and other features.

== Reception ==
Lost Coast was generally well received by video game critics. 1UP.com enjoyed the amount of detail, including the graphics, puzzles, and intelligent enemies, saying, "Valve just packed more atmosphere into a tiny snippet than most shooters muster, period." The review also praised the level's commentary system, calling it an informative addition, and enjoyed the interesting and insightful comments made by some of its creators. The level satisfied UGO because "it would be harder not to enjoy this level in all its beautifully rendered glory—even after you've broken all the windows and spattered the walls with Combine blood," and GameSpot commented that "the textures in Lost Coast are noticeably more detailed and numerous than in the retail game." The review concluded hoping that the features introduced in Lost Coast would be included in Valve's future releases.

Negative reaction to the game focused on its length and gameplay. 1UP.com and UGO both considered it short; Shawn Elliott of 1UP.com described it as "a lickety-split run through postcard-pretty tide pools, up cliffs, and into a church turned Combine outpost". UGO's Nigel Grammer stated that Lost Coast's gameplay seemed secondary to the graphics. The gameplay also disappointed Brad Shoemaker of GameSpot, who found it too similar to Half-Life 2 and so "isn't going to set the world on fire".
