= Half-Life: Blue Shift =

2001 video game

- North American cover art, depicting the game's protagonist, Barney Calhoun
- Developer: Gearbox Software
- Publisher: Sierra On-Line
- Director: Randy Pitchford
- Producer: Randy Pitchford
- Designer: Rob Heironimus
- Programmers: Sean Cavanaugh; Patrick Deupree
- Artist: Brian Martel
- Writers: Rob Heironimus; David Mertz; Randy Pitchford
- Composers: Stephen Bahl; Chris Jensen
- Series: Half-Life
- Engine: GoldSrc
- Platforms: Windows, OS X, Linux
- Release: Windows: NA: June 12, 2001; EU: June 15, 2001; OS X, Linux: WW: July 31, 2013
- Genre: First-person shooter
- Mode: Single-player

Half-Life: Blue Shift is an expansion pack for the first-person shooter video game Half-Life (1998). It was developed by Gearbox Software and published by Sierra On-Line. Blue Shift was the second expansion for Half-Life, originally intended as part of a Dreamcast port of Half-Life. Although the Dreamcast port was cancelled, the Windows version was released as a standalone product on June 12, 2001.

As with Gearbox's previous expansion pack, Opposing Force (1999), Blue Shift returns to the setting and events of Half-Life, but portrays the story through the eyes of another character. Players control security guard Barney Calhoun, employed by the Black Mesa Research Facility, who must fight his way to safety during an alien invasion. Blue Shift also includes a graphics pack that upgrades the Half-Life models and textures.

Blue Shift received mixed reviews. Many reviewers were critical of the short length and lack of new content, although the new graphics were praised.

== Gameplay ==
Blue Shift is the first Half-Life game to feature consistent interaction with a single non-player character, Dr. Rosenberg.

As an expansion pack for Half-Life, Blue Shift is a first-person shooter. The overall gameplay of Blue Shift does not significantly differ from that of Half-Life: players are required to navigate through the game's levels, fight hostile non-player characters and solve a variety of puzzles to advance. The game continues Half-Life's methods of an unbroken narrative. The player sees everything through the first-person perspective of the protagonist, and remains in control of the player character for almost all the game. Story events are conveyed through the use of scripted sequences rather than cut scenes. Progress through the game's world is continuous; although the game is divided up into chapters, the only significant pauses are when the game needs to load the next part of an environment.

The player battles through the game alone, but is occasionally assisted by friendly non-player characters. Security guards and scientists will occasionally help the player in reaching new areas and convey relevant plot information. Blue Shift also includes a substantial section dedicated to keeping a major character in the story safe from enemy characters, and escorting him to a specific location. A selection of enemies from Half-Life populate the game, including alien creatures such as headcrabs and Vortigaunts. The player also encounters human opponents in the form of a detachment of US Marines who have been sent to eliminate the alien threat and silence any witnesses. Blue Shift does not elaborate on the storyline in Opposing Force, the preceding expansion pack, and no enemy characters or weapons introduced in it appear in the game. The player is instead given access to a limited selection of Half-Life's original weaponry.

== Synopsis ==
=== Setting ===
Blue Shift is set in the same location and time frame as that of Half-Life, taking place at a remote New Mexico laboratory called the Black Mesa Research Facility. In Half-Life, the player takes on the role of Gordon Freeman, a scientist involved in an accident that opens an interdimensional portal to the borderworld of Xen, allowing the alien creatures of Xen to attack the facility. The player guides Freeman in an attempt to escape the facility and close the portal, ultimately traveling to Xen to do so. As in Opposing Force, Blue Shift shows the events of Half-Life from the perspective of a different protagonist. The player assumes the role of Barney Calhoun, a security guard working near the labs where the accident takes place. Calhoun is responsible for the preservation of equipment and materials and the welfare of research personnel, and after the accident turns Black Mesa into a warzone, he must work with Dr. Rosenberg, a high-ranking scientist involved in the experiment, to evacuate the facility.

=== Plot ===
Blue Shift begins similarly to Half-Life, as Barney Calhoun rides a train through the Black Mesa research facility to reach his place of work. After reporting for duty, Calhoun is instructed to assist in maintenance on a malfunctioning elevator. As Calhoun finishes repairs, however, Freeman's experiment takes place and results in a "resonance cascade", causing massive damage to the facility and teleporting alien creatures into the base. The elevator is badly damaged and fails, sending Calhoun plummeting into the depths of Black Mesa.

Calhoun regains consciousness at the bottom of the shaft and begins to fight his way to the surface to escape. Emerging near Black Mesa's classification yards, Calhoun learns that Dr. Rosenberg and his colleagues plan to escape the facility using teleportation technology. After freeing Rosenberg from the captivity of the US Marines detachment sent to silence the facility, Calhoun escorts him to a decommissioned prototype teleportation laboratory, where several Black Mesa employees have already gathered. Rosenberg then teleports Calhoun to the Xen borderworld to calibrate research equipment needed to pinpoint a teleport destination outside of Black Mesa. Upon his return, Rosenberg informs Calhoun that the teleporter's battery power has been exhausted, and contact has been lost with a team sent to acquire a new power cell.

Calhoun travels to the power generators on a lower level to find a fresh power cell while firefights rage between the Marines and the forces of Xen. After returning with a new power cell, Calhoun assists Rosenberg in evacuating the few surviving personnel through the teleporter. Calhoun is the last to enter the portal and as he does so, Marines breach the laboratory and fire on him, causing the teleporter to explode. As a result of the teleporter's destruction, Calhoun enters a "harmonic reflux", causing him to be rapidly teleported to a variety of locations in Xen and Black Mesa. At one location, he witnesses Freeman's capture by Marines midway through Half-Life, before eventually stabilizing at the intended teleport location with Rosenberg at the outskirts of Black Mesa, where they then escape the facility in a company SUV.

== Development ==
The High Definition pack placed higher quality models in the game, doubling the number of polygons used in the original models.

Blue Shift was announced in the second quarter of 2000 as part of an upcoming Dreamcast port of Half-Life. While the port was developed by Captivation Digital Laboratories, Blue Shift was developed by Gearbox Software, who also developed the first Half-Life expansion, Opposing Force. The game had the working title Half-Life: Guard Duty; publisher Sierra Entertainment announced the name Blue Shift on August 30, 2000. As with Opposing Force, the title has a double meaning, referring to both the blue shift light phenomenon and the name of Barney's shift. The Dreamcast port would include higher detail models and textures that were double the polygon count of Valve's original Half-Life models.

At the European Computer Trade Show in September 2000, information about Blue Shift's story and development direction was revealed, along with a release date of November 1, 2000, for the Dreamcast version of Half-Life. The port was delayed by Sierra to ensure the "high expectations of consumers" were met, anticipating release by the end of the year.

On March 29, 2001, Sierra announced that Blue Shift would also be released for Windows as a standalone game that would not require the original Half-Life to run. The new models developed for the Dreamcast version would also be included in the PC version as the Half-Life High Definition pack, and could be applied to Half-Life and Opposing Force. At the E3 2001, Gearbox announced that Blue Shift was complete and exhibited a playable version. It was released on June 12, 2001, in North America, and on June 15 in Europe. On June 16, 2001, Sierra canceled the Dreamcast port of Half-Life, citing "changing market conditions". A late build of the Dreamcast version eventually leaked online, featuring complete versions of Half-Life and Blue Shift.

Blue Shift and the High Definition pack were initially absent from the launch of Valve's content delivery system Steam in September 2003, despite the presence of both Half-Life and Opposing Force on the system. The game was released on Steam on August 29, 2005, along with the High Definition Pack. Blue Shift was also published as part of Sierra's Half-Life: Generation compilation in 2002, and as part of Valve and Electronic Arts' Half-Life 1: Anthology on September 26, 2005.

== Reception ==
Reception

Aggregate score
| Aggregator | Score |
|---|---|
| Metacritic | 71/100 |

Review scores
| Publication | Score |
|---|---|
| Computer Gaming World | 4/5 |
| EP Daily | 7/10 |
| Eurogamer | 6/10 |
| Game Informer | 6.75/10 |
| GameRevolution | B− |
| GameSpot | 7/10 |
| GameSpy | 70% |
| GameZone | 9/10 |
| IGN | 7/10 |
| Next Generation | 1/5 |
| PC Gamer (US) | 64% |
| X-Play | 2/5 |
| Maxim | 3/5 |

The PC version received "mixed or average reviews" according to the review aggregation website Metacritic.

In a review for IGN, critic Tal Blevins noted that Blue Shift's gameplay "is pretty much what we've come to expect out of Half-Life" by blending action and puzzle solving, stating that the latter "were all logical and well done, although some of the jumping puzzles were frustrating". Though IGN praised the game for maintaining the "epic" feel of the original, Blevins was critical of the relatively short length of the game. GameSpot reviewer Greg Kasavin agreed with many of IGN's criticisms, stating that "it's not that the game is easy so much that it's extremely short" and that Blue Shift "doesn't amount to much on its own terms". In addition, Kasavin described the graphical enhancements brought about by the High Definition pack as "helpful", but noted that "they still don't make Half-Life look like a new game—nor are many of the changes themselves very noticeable".

Other reviews echoed complaints about the similarity of Blue Shift to previous games. GameSpy reviewer Jamie Madigan stated that "what really pulls the game down is the 'more of the same' factor". Although writing that the game "feels like just a few more levels for the original game", he noted that this is what Blue Shift was designed to be, given its origins as an add-on for a Dreamcast version of Half-Life. Madigan described the single-player campaign as "decent" and commented that the new graphics made the game "worthy of consideration". Eurogamer echoed criticism on the game's length; reviewer Tom Bramwell commented that "although I'm hard pressed to criticize what you get, the complete absence of everything we've learnt from the likes of Counter-Strike and everything since is frankly bizarre". Bramwell did, however, criticize the game's artificial intelligence and the occasional bug that caused a player to get stuck on a wall.

PC Zone's Mark Hill was more lenient, praising the game's artificial intelligence as "intelligent as you could hope an AI enemy to be". In addition, Hill praised the game for showing more activity in the base, noting that "a whole world goes on around you, with people eating at a cantina and scientists doing their laundry. The complex is more alive than ever before". Hill also praised the focus "on a greater interaction with scientists as proper people rather than the two or three models that were cloned throughout the facility who kept repeating the same phrases", describing this as Blue Shift's "greatest achievement". PC Zone's review closed by commenting that "as a Dreamcast extra it works perfectly, but as a standalone PC title there's not nearly enough to it." In his negative review of the game, Jim Preston of NextGen recommended that players play the Half-Life mods They Hunger or Day of Defeat instead.

The game sold around 800,000 units at retail, excluding digital sales on Steam.
