= Unreleased Half-Life games =

Unreleased video games

Half-Life is a series of first-person shooter games created and published by Valve. Since the release of the original Half-Life for Windows in 1998, several Half-Life projects have been canceled, including some developed by other studios.

In 1999, Valve canceled a Half-Life port for Mac developed by Logicware. Half-Life: Hostile Takeover, an expansion pack for Half-Life developed by 2015, was cancelled in 2000. In 2001, Sierra, the publisher of the original Half-Life, canceled a port for Dreamcast after Sega announced its discontinuation.

After releasing Half-Life 2: Episode Two in 2007, Valve struggled to settle on a direction for a new Half-Life game. Episode Three was canceled after Valve abandoned episodic development and began developing a new game engine, Source 2. Another Half-Life 2 episode, by Junction Point Studios, was canceled after Junction Point was acquired by Disney Interactive Studios. Valve moved the project to Arkane Studios, who developed it as Ravenholm. Valve canceled it as they felt it was creatively constrained.

Valve developed Half-Life 3 between 2013 and 2014, experimenting with procedurally generated levels, but canceled it as the Source 2 engine was still unfinished. A virtual reality (VR) game set on a time-travelling ship, Borealis, was canceled as the VR technology and tools were not complete. As of 2026, datamines and leaks suggested that a Half-Life game codenamed HLX is in development using Source 2.

== Half-Life era (1998–2004) ==
=== Half-Life: Hostile Takeover ===
On November 23, 1999, GameSpot reported that 2015 was developing a Half-Life expansion pack to follow Half-Life: Opposing Force. On March 18, 2000, the Adrenaline Vault reported that the expansion was named Half-Life: Hostile Takeover and that it had appeared on retail product lists with a release date of late August. On August 7, the Adrenaline Vault reported that Sierra, the publisher of Half-Life, had informed them that Hostile Takeover had been canceled. The stock keeping unit for Hostile Takeover was repurposed by online retailers for Half-Life: Counter-Strike. On June 21, 2001, Valve filed a video game trademark for "Hostile Takeover". After several extensions, the trademark expired on October 3, 2004.

=== Dreamcast port ===
On February 14, 2000, Sierra announced that a port of Half-Life for the Dreamcast console was in development by Captivation Digital Laboratories with Valve and Gearbox Software. It would feature improvements including higher-polygon character models and new lighting effects. Gearbox, who had developed Opposing Force, created a new single-player campaign for the port, Half-Life: Blue Shift, focusing on the security guard Barney.

The port was delayed to November, when game publications began to receive early copies for review. Reception was mixed, with criticism for the inconsistent frame rate, long loading times and lack of online play. Sierra planned to release a version with online multiplayer using SegaNet. The Gearbox CEO, Randy Pitchford, said he suggested adding multiplayer modes and mods from the Windows version, including Team Fortress Classic and the multiplayer modes from Opposing Force. Sierra delayed the port again and said they hoped to finish development that year.

On March 29, 2001, Sierra announced that Blue Shift would be released for Windows along with the character models developed for the Dreamcast version, as part of the Half-Life High Definition Pack. On June 16, 2001, four days after the release of Blue Shift, Sierra announced that it had canceled the Dreamcast port, citing "changing market conditions". It was weeks away from its release date and virtually complete. In 2013, a late version of the Dreamcast port leaked online, featuring complete versions of Half-Life and Blue Shift.

=== Mac port ===
A version of Half-Life for Mac OS was announced by Logicware on April 23, 1999. However, Valve canceled it a few months later in October 1999. The Valve CEO, Gabe Newell, said the port was substandard, citing a separate multiplayer network, no automatic update utility and the inability to include Valve's multiplayer mod Team Fortress Classic. He said he did not want to make Mac players "second-class customers" and preferred to write off the investment rather than "take money from Mac customers and short-change them". Rebecca Heineman, the co-founder of Logicware, denied this, saying that Valve cancelled the port as Apple had angered them by misrepresenting sales projections. She said the port was complete and three weeks from release. In 2013, Valve released a port for OS X.

== Half-Life 2 era (2004–2008) ==
=== Half-Life 2: Episode Three ===
In May 2006, Valve announced a trilogy of episodic games that would continue the story of Half-Life 2 (2004). Episode One was released in 2006, followed by Episode Two in 2007. Episode Three was initially announced for Christmas 2007 and was highly anticipated. Valve released little information in the following years, and in 2011 Wired described it as vaporware.

Valve canceled Episode Three as they had become fatigued with Half-Life and struggled to identify new gameplay mechanics. They eventually abandoned episodic development, as they wanted to create more ambitious games. Additionally, as developing Half-Life 2 and the original Source game engine simultaneously had created problems, Valve delayed development of a new Half-Life until their new engine, Source 2, was complete.

In 2017, the Half-Life writer, Marc Laidlaw, released a short story that journalists speculated was a summary of the Episode Three plot. In 2024, Valve released footage and concept art of Episode Three as part of a documentary about the making of Half-Life 2.

=== Junction Point Studios episode ===
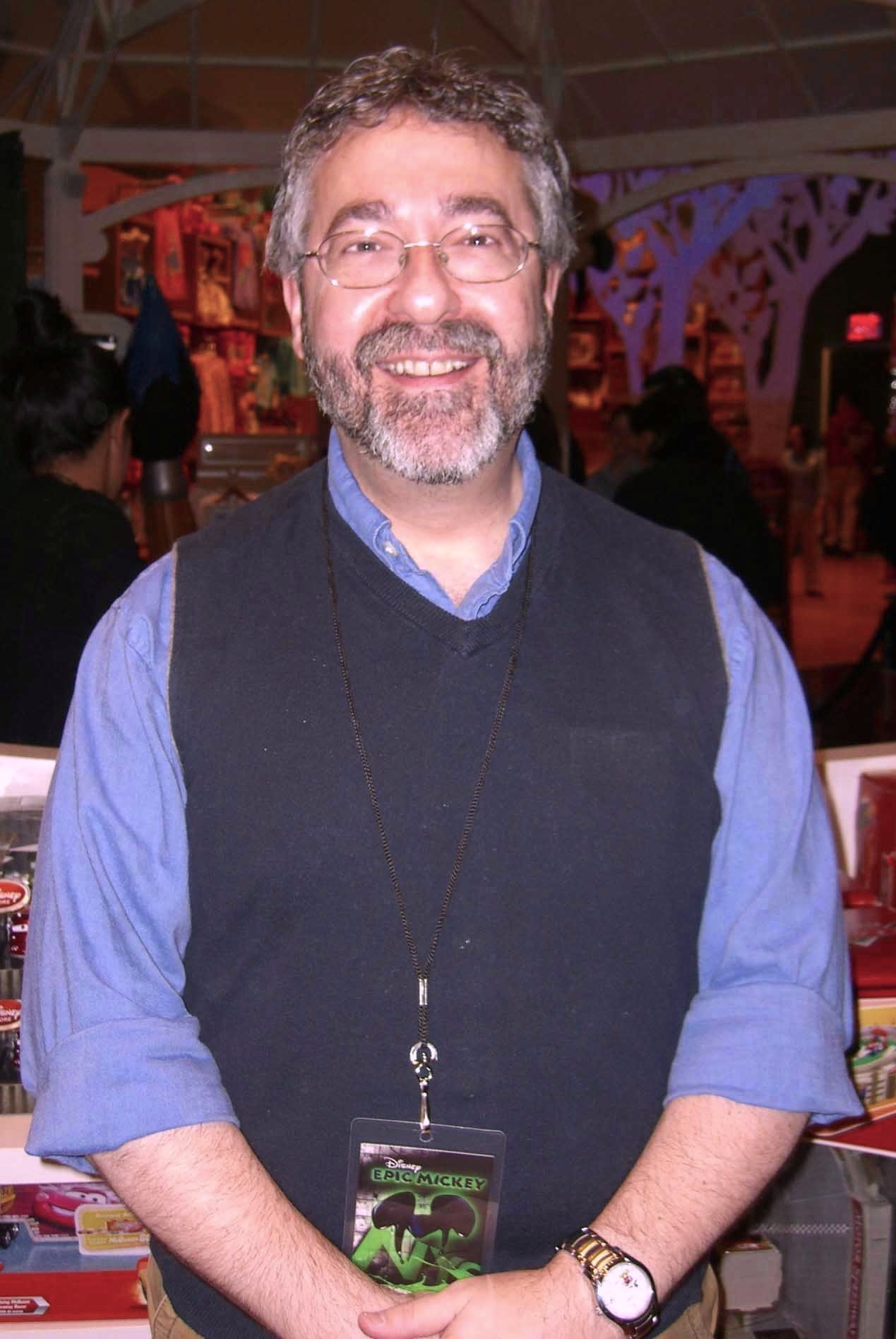
Warren Spector (pictured in 2010) led development of a canceled Half-Life 2 episode.

Another Half-Life 2 episode was developed by Junction Point Studios, led by Warren Spector. The episode showed how the town of Ravenholm from Half-Life 2 became infested with headcrabs and zombies, with the return of the character of Father Grigori. It included a "magnet gun", which fired projectiles that magnetized metal surfaces and attracted objects and enemies, and was used for combat and puzzles.

Junction Point worked on the game for a year, producing enough content to demonstrate one section, and a vertical slice that demonstrated the magnet gun. Valve lost interest in the project and Junction Point, who had been acquired by Disney Interactive Studios partway through, canceled it to instead develop Epic Mickey. Screenshots appeared in early 2017.

=== Ravenholm ===
In 2007 or 2008, Valve gave the Junction Point project to Arkane Studios in Lyon, France. Valve gave them creative freedom, as they had with Gearbox and Opposing Force, providing feedback and technical support. Arkane developed it into a game with the working title Ravenholm, referred to by some sources as Episode Four.

Players controlled Adrian Shephard from Opposing Force, working alongside Father Grigori, who had taken refuge in an abandoned psychiatric hospital. Grigori was experimenting with the effects of headcrab venom on himself and would mutate through the story. The player would use the magnet gun and traps created by Grigori against enemies. Arkane also implemented a nail gun that could create paths to conduct electricity and set traps.

Valve canceled Ravenholm with approximately one year of development remaining. Laidlaw said it was hampered by the fact that it needed to take place before Episode Three, so as not to advance the story beyond Valve's games, and that Valve felt the zombie premise was played out. He also said that Arkane, like Valve with Episode Three, had struggled to discover fun new game systems with the Half-Life 2 tools. The Arkane founder, Raphaël Colantonio, believed that Valve decided it would be too expensive. Ravenholm was first shown publicly in a 2020 documentary by the company Noclip. Noclip released an hour of gameplay footage in 2022.

== Source 2 era (2013–present) ==
=== Half-Life 3 ===
Half-Life 3 was in development between 2013 and 2014. Valve planned to use procedurally generated levels alongside a "crafted experience", similar to the Left 4 Dead series; the game would generate different routes through environments each time it was played. The team took new scans of the face of Frank Sheldon, whose likeness was used for the G-Man character in Half-Life 2. The Source 2 engine was still unfinished and the project was canceled early in development.

=== Borealis ===
Shortly before his departure from Valve in 2016, Laidlaw led a virtual reality (VR) project on the Source 2 engine, Borealis, set on the time-travelling ship mentioned in Episode Two and Portal 2. The game would skip between the Combine's conquering of Earth before Half-Life 2 and a time set shortly after Episode Two. A minigame in which players would fish off the bow of the ship was also proposed. Laidlaw said the project ended because it was too early to be working in VR: "When people are struggling with the basic tools they need to rough out a concept, it's hard to convey any sort of vision, and it all evaporated pretty quickly."

=== HLX ===
Following the release of Half-Life: Alyx in 2020, dataminers examining updates to the Source 2 engine discovered that Valve was developing a non-VR game codenamed HLX. PC Gamer noted that the codename resembled HLVR, Valve's codename for Alyx. On December 31, 2024, Mike Shapiro, the voice actor for the G-Man, posted a cryptic message on X suggesting "unexpected surprises" in the new year. In April 2025, it was reported that HLX was Half-Life 3, that it was nearing completion and that Valve planned a 2025 announcement.

In December, the Insider Gaming senior editor Mike Straw said HLX had been planned as a launch game for Valve's Steam Machine hardware, released in June 2026, and that its announcement had been delayed by the rising cost of RAM. Other reports suggested that Valve was not yet satisfied with its graphical quality. In October, the Valve composer Mike Morasky mentioned HLX briefly during a Q&A panel at GameSoundCon, seemingly by mistake, but gave no details.
