= Gravity Gun =

Fictional device in the Half-Life series

- Half-Life element
- Created by: Valve Software

In-universe information
- Owners: Eli Vance, Gordon Freeman
- Function: Weapon, tool

The Gravity Gun (also known as the Zero-point Energy Field Manipulator) is a fictional device from the first-person shooter video game Half-Life 2 and its subsequent episodes wielded by the protagonist, Gordon Freeman. Designed for handling hazardous materials, but mostly used for heavy lifting by the anti-Combine resistance, it is capable of picking up and throwing numerous types of objects, including extremely heavy ones, at a high rate of speed, and is used as both a weapon and an obstacle-clearing tool. Due to the novel game mechanics it allows for, it has become known as one of the most iconic video game weapons, and inspired similar physics manipulation tools in subsequent games.

== Appearances ==
The Gravity Gun (depicted here in artwork for Half-Life 2: Deathmatch) is capable of turning innocuous objects into weapons, as well as assisting in physics-based puzzles.

The Gravity Gun is first given to Gordon Freeman by his ally in the anti-Combine resistance, Alyx Vance, after which he uses it as both a weapon and tool. Certain objects in the game world, such as saw blades, can be used as de facto "ammunition", and the Zombie Chopper achievement rewards the player for beating the Ravenholm segment - an abandoned town infested by headcrab zombies - using only the Gravity Gun. Late in the game, Freeman is captured by the Combine and forced to relinquish all his weapons. However, in a sudden plot twist, the Gravity Gun is accidentally supercharged by the energy field meant to destroy it, turning blue and becoming capable of grabbing and throwing living objects, including the Combine themselves. This allows Freeman to escape and defeat the malevolent Doctor Breen.

== Reception ==
The gravity gun was very well received by critics, who considered it one of the defining features of Half-Life 2's entertainment value. Planet Half-Life called the gravity gun "the next level in interactive gaming." Electronic Gaming Monthly described Half-Life 2's gravity gun as the "thinking man's death tool," which lets players "toy with gravity to kill foes with everyday objects." Call of Duty series military adviser Hank Keirsey stated that "the weapon is not very practical". He did, however, discuss its historical precedents, further stating that "The ancients learned very early how to use gravity to their advantage — but this usually involved rolling rocks down hills or pouring boiling oil down the castle walls. Those that failed to respect gravity suffered."

Andy Kelly of GamesRadar+ called the Gravity Gun one way that Half-Life 2 changed gaming forever, citing its usage as a weapon in the zombie-infested town of Ravenholm as a particular high point that caused numerous subsequent games to incorporate physics manipulation devices into their gameplay. Christopher Livingston of PC Gamer described the moment the Gravity Gun turned blue as one of the great moments in PC gaming, calling it a "glorious, cathartic moment".

== Legacy ==
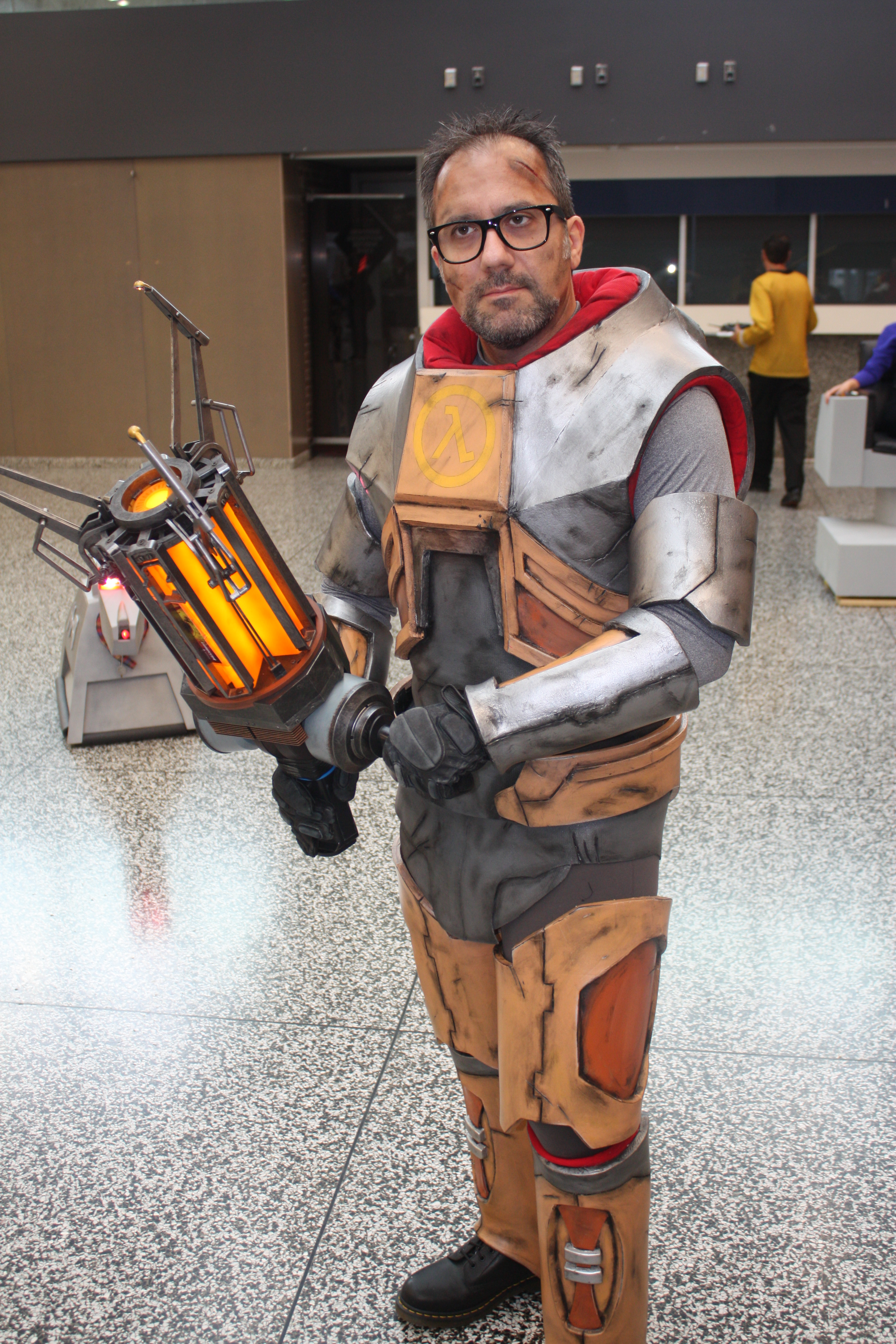
Cosplay of Gordon Freeman wielding a Gravity Gun at Montreal Comiccon 2014

A weapon similar to the Gravity Gun, known as the Grabber, was introduced in the 2005 Doom 3 expansion pack, Resurrection of Evil. Dead Space (2008) was planned to incorporate a device called the TK Gun to pick up and throw objects, which became the Kinesis Module. Rage 2 (2018) featured a purely combat-oriented gravity gun that allowed players to slam enemies against walls when tagged with special bullets. The Gravity Gun is one of several video game weapons used in a climactic fight for the 2021 film Free Guy. The handheld multitool in Squadron 42 was compared to a Gravity Gun by critics.

Valve's 2020 virtual reality game Half-Life: Alyx, a prequel to Half-Life 2, contains a pair of "gravity gloves" wielded by protagonist Alyx Vance, which provide function similar to the gravity gun with the ability to lift and throw objects, though tailored to work as standard VR in-game hand controls.

The Portal Gun, formally the Aperture Science Handheld Portal Device, featured in the Portal series was also inspired by the Gravity Gun, featuring a similar three-pronged science fiction design. Both the Gravity Gun and Portal Gun, while superficially resembling directed-energy weapons, instead function moreso as tools to reward lateral thinking and manipulating one's environment to overcome obstacles. The Portal Gun introduced in Portal 1 (2007) refines such gameplay concepts to focus entirely on transportation and puzzle-solving, allowing the player to avoid and outmaneuver hazards rather than facing them head on.

Props of the Gravity Gun and Portal Gun are popular items for both cosplayers and collectors. Notable examples include two film-quality replicas by Australian artist Harrison Krix, which were auctioned for charity in 2010 and 2011.

== See also ==
- Anti-gravity
- Tractor beam
