= Half-Life 2: Episode One =

2006 video game

- Cover art showing key character Alyx Vance
- Developer: Valve (Note: Nvidia Lightspeed Studios developed the Nvidia Shield version.)
- Publisher: Valve
- Writers: Marc Laidlaw; Erik Wolpaw; Chet Faliszek
- Composer: Kelly Bailey
- Series: Half-Life
- Engine: Source
- Platforms: Windows; Xbox 360; PlayStation 3; Mac OS X; Linux; Nvidia Shield
- Release: June 1, 2006: Microsoft Windows; WW: June 1, 2006; Xbox 360; NA: October 10, 2007; EU: October 19, 2007; AU: October 25, 2007; PlayStation 3; NA: December 14, 2007; EU: December 14, 2007; AU: December 20, 2007; Mac OS X; WW: May 26, 2010; Linux; WW: June 26, 2013; Nvidia Shield; WW: December 15, 2014
- Genre: First-person shooter
- Mode: Single-player

Half-Life 2: Episode One is a 2006 first-person shooter game developed and published by Valve for Windows. It continues the story of Half-Life 2 (2004). As the scientist Gordon Freeman, players must escape City 17 with Gordon's companion Alyx Vance. Like previous Half-Life games, Episode One combines shooting, puzzles and storytelling.

After the six-year development of Half-Life 2, Valve switched to episodic development, planning to release games more frequently. They focused on developing the character of Alyx and expanded her artificial intelligence. Episode One uses an updated version of Valve's Source engine, with new lighting and animation technology.

Episode One received mostly positive reviews; the co-operative gameplay with Alyx received particular praise, although the short length was criticized. It was ported to Xbox 360 and PlayStation 3 as part of the 2007 compilation The Orange Box. Episode Two followed in 2007.

== Gameplay ==
Players make their way through a linear series of levels and encounter various enemies and allies. The gameplay is broken up between combat-oriented challenges and physics-based puzzles. Episode One integrates tutorial-like tasks into the story to familiarize the player with new gameplay mechanics without breaking immersion. A head-up display appears on the screen to display the player's health, energy, and ammunition. The player accesses new weapons and ammunition that are used to defend against enemy forces. Unlike in Half-Life 2, where Gordon's first weapon is the crowbar, Gordon first acquires the Gravity Gun, which allows the player to manipulate objects at a distance in both combat and puzzle-solving scenarios.

The artificial intelligence (AI) for Alyx Vance, Gordon's companion, was designed for co-operative play to complement the player's abilities. The developers described Alyx's programming as a "personality code" as opposed to an "AI code", emphasizing the attention they gave to make Alyx a unique and believable companion. For part of the code, she was explicitly programmed to avoid performing too many mechanical or repetitive actions, such as repeating lines of dialogue or performing certain routines in combat situations. Examples of this co-operative gameplay include combat in underground levels. In this scenario, the player can conserve their ammunition by using a flashlight to help Alyx spot and kill oncoming enemies. Similarly, Alyx will often take up strategic positions and provide covering fire to keep the player safe while they travel to a certain area or perform certain actions.

== Plot ==
Alyx Vance talks with Isaac Kleiner outside the Citadel. The new HDR rendering and Phong shading effects are visible.

In City 17, Gordon Freeman and Alyx Vance (Merle Dandridge) have destroyed the Citadel's reactor. As it explodes, several vortigaunts (Louis Gossett Jr.) appear and extract Alyx. The G-Man (Michael Shapiro), who extracted Gordon from the explosion, is confronted by the vortigaunts and his psychic connection to Gordon is severed.

Gordon awakens in the ruins of City 17, where he is rescued from a pile of rubble by Dog and reunited with Alyx. Alyx makes contact with Dr. Eli Vance (Robert Guillaume) and Dr. Isaac Kleiner (Harry S. Robins), who have escaped the city. Kleiner informs them that the Citadel's core will soon collapse and destroy the city.

Gordon and Alyx proceed into the core to temporarily stabilize it. Alyx discovers that the Combine is attempting to accelerate its destruction to send a transmission back to their homeworld. She downloads a copy of the transmission and a video recorded by Judith Mossman (Michelle Forbes), in which she discusses the location of an unknown project before being subdued by a Combine attack.

Gordon and Alyx board a Combine train to escape the Citadel, but it derails. They proceed underground and through the city streets, fighting past disorganized Combine forces and rampant Xen wildlife. Near a Combine-held train station, Gordon and Alyx reunite with Barney Calhoun (Michael Shapiro), to evacuate refugees from the city. They escort the refugees and take a different train out of City 17, escaping just as the reactor detonates, which delivers the Combine transmission. As several pods containing Advisors flee the collapsing Citadel, the explosion's shockwave derails the train.

== Development ==
Valve developed Half-Life 2 (2004) over six years using its new game engine, Source. Instead of beginning work on a full sequel, Valve decided to create a series of episodic sequels. The designer Robin Walker said the team had become comfortable with their tools, and wanted to capitalize on their experience instead of developing new technologies. Valve's president, Gabe Newell, said customers would be happier with a new Half-Life game delivered in a shorter time rather than waiting years for another "monolithic product".

In April 2005, Valve announced the game under the working title Aftermath. The title Episode One was announced in February 2006. In May, Valve announced that Episode One would be the first in a trilogy of episodic games to be released over the following two years. Newell said he considered the trilogy the equivalent of Half-Life 3. According to Newell, whereas the original Half-Life (1998) saw the G-Man transform Freeman into his tool, and Half-Life 2 saw Freeman being used by G-Man, the episodes would see G-Man lose control.

While the plots and dialogue of Half-Life and Half-Life 2 were written solely by Marc Laidlaw, the Half-Life 2 episodes were written by Laidlaw and the new employees Chet Faliszek and Erik Wolpaw. Valve's focus was character development, particularly that of Gordon's companion Alyx, who accompanies the player for most of Episode One. Walker said it was ironic that the player spends most of Half-Life 2 alone despite the themes of "characters and other people".

Valve modified Alyx's AI to allow her to react to the player. Changes include commentating on objects the player manipulates or obstacles they have overcome. She also acts as an essential device in both plot exposition and directing the player's journey, often vocalizing what the player is required to do next to progress. Valve did not want Alyx to obstruct the player, and sometimes reduced her input and dialogue so players would not feel pressured or bothered by her presence. Valve placed what they described as "hero moments" to allow the player to single-handedly overcome obstacles such as challenging enemies, during which Alyx takes the role of an observer and gives the player praise. The game was extensively playtested so that Valve could gauge its effectiveness and difficulty.

Episode One was made with an upgraded version of Source, with more advanced lighting effects and a new version of its facial animation/expression technology. Upgrades to enemy AI allow Combine soldiers to use tactics previously unavailable to them. For example, Combine soldiers were given the ability to crouch while being fired upon so they could duck underneath the player's line of fire. The soundtrack was composed by Kelly Bailey. The music is used sparingly; it plays primarily during scenes of major plot developments or particularly important action sequences, such as large battles or when encountering a new enemy.

Extensive alterations were made to the appearance of both City 17 and the Citadel from the end of Half-Life 2 to reflect the changing shape of the world and remind the player that their actions have major effects on the storyline. The Citadel has degenerated from a cold, alien and imposing fortress into an extremely unstable state. This provides a visual cue of the catastrophic damage the player has inflicted, and it allows for the introduction of new gameplay elements that accentuate the dangers which come with the Citadel's imminent collapse. It also serves a thematic purpose by highlighting the weakening of the Combine's dominance in City 17. Likewise, City 17 was altered to reflect the aftermath of the resistance's open rebellion, with vast swathes of destroyed buildings, and the introduction of foes previously kept outside its confines in Half-Life 2 to emphasize the scale of the uprising.

== Release ==
Episode One was sold in both retail stores and Valve's online Steam distribution system, where it was sold at a discount price. It was also distributed by Electronic Arts as a standalone release. It was available for pre-load and pre-purchase through Steam on May 1, 2006, with Half-Life Deathmatch: Source and Half-Life 2: Deathmatch immediately available for play as part of the package. Episode One was rereleased in the compilation The Orange Box for Mac, PC, Xbox 360, and PlayStation 3. About 1.4 million retail copies of Episode One had been sold by 2008. In November 2024, Valve delisted Episode One and Episode Two from the Steam Store and incorporated them into Half-Life 2.

== Reception ==
Reception

Aggregate scores
Aggregator	Score
GameRankings	85.82%
Metacritic	87/100

Review scores
Publication	Score
Edge	8/10
GameRevolution	B
GameSpot	8.7/10
GameSpy	4.5/5
IGN	8.5/10
PC Gamer (UK)	90%
PC Gamer (US)	85%
PC PowerPlay	10/10

Response to Episode One was generally positive. Reviewers praised it for having more intricate, well paced gameplay than Half-Life 2. The interactivity, particularly in the form of Alyx and her reactions to the player's actions and story events, was also praised. PC Gamer commented that "while this inaugural episode may not be the essential FPS that Half-Life 2 is, I can't imagine any shooter fan who'd want to miss it." PC Gamer directed particular praise to the balance between puzzle-oriented and action-oriented challenges throughout the game.

Edge praised the "deftness" with which the game directed the player's eyes, and the strength of Alyx as a companion, concluding: "In an interactive genre bound to the traditions of the pop-up gun and invisible hero, it simply doesn't get more sophisticated than this." Episode One earned scores of 87/100 and 85.59% on review aggregators Metacritic and GameRankings respectively. IGN awarded Episode One "Best PC FPS of 2006" and described it as a "great bang for the buck using Valve's new episodic plan", although it did not offer "the complete experience that Half-Life 2 was". GameSpy ranked Episode One ninth on its 2006 "Games of the Year" list, and it also noted the implementation of Alyx as a believable and useful companion.

Episode One takes roughly 4–6 hours to complete, which raised the issue of whether it justified its price. Computer Games Magazine argued the futility of reviewing the game due to its episodic nature; as the first part of a three-part story arc, it is difficult to judge it when divorced from the final product. Game Revolution expressed disappointment at a lack of new features such as environments and weapons. During the 10th Annual Interactive Achievement Awards, the Academy of Interactive Arts & Sciences nominated Half-Life 2: Episode One for "First-Person Action Game of the Year".

== Sequels ==
Half-Life 2: Episode Two was released in 2007. Episode Three was scheduled for release by Christmas 2007, but was canceled as Valve found the episodic model contrary to their growing ambition for new installments, and needed to dedicate resources to Left 4 Dead, which was nearing completion. After canceling several further Half-Life projects, Valve released a prequel, Half-Life: Alyx, in 2020.
