= Half-Life (series) =

Video game series

- The series' logo, an orange lambda, is a prominent symbol throughout the series.
- Developers: Valve; Gearbox Software (1999–2001)
- Publishers: Sierra On-Line (1998–2003); Valve (2004–present)
- Platforms: Windows; macOS; Linux; Xbox; Xbox 360; PlayStation 2; PlayStation 3; Shield Portable
- First release: Half-Life; November 19, 1998
- Latest release: Half-Life: Alyx; March 23, 2020

Half-Life is a series of first-person shooter games created by Valve. The games combine shooting combat, puzzles and storytelling, and are played entirely from the first-person perspective with no cutscenes.

The original Half-Life, Valve's first product, was released in 1998 for Windows. Players control silent protagonist Gordon Freeman, a scientist working at the Black Mesa Research Facility who must survive an alien invasion caused by the facility. The use of innovative scripted sequences instead of cutscenes was influential on the first-person shooter genre, and the game inspired numerous community-developed mods, leading to the release of the multiplayer games Counter-Strike and Day of Defeat. Half-Life was followed by the expansions Opposing Force (1999), Blue Shift (2001) and Decay (2001), developed by Gearbox Software.

In 2004, Valve released Half-Life 2, developed using their game engine Source. It features a more dystopian setting, stronger focus on characters and physics-based gameplay. Set twenty years after Half-Life, players control Freeman in joining a resistance to liberate humanity from an oppressive alien force known as the Combine. It was followed by the episodic sequels Episode One (2006) and Episode Two (2007). Also set in the same universe as Half-Life is the Portal series; the first game was released in 2007 followed by a sequel in 2011. Both games focus on first-person puzzle-platform gameplay using wormholes created by a portal gun.

Over the following decade, numerous Half-Life games were canceled, including Episode Three; a version of Half-Life 3; Borealis, a VR spin-off; and games developed by Junction Point Studios and Arkane Studios. In 2020, after years of speculation, Valve released Half-Life: Alyx, which was developed exclusively for virtual reality headsets. It is a prequel set five years before Half-Life 2, where players control Freeman's eventual ally Alyx Vance in her quest to rescue her father from Combine forces and uncover their mysterious "super-weapon".

The Half-Life series is recognized by critics and industry experts for producing some of the most influential first-person shooter games for the genre, both of which have been highlighted for their advancements towards immersive and varied gameplay, level design, storytelling, visuals and sound. Half-Life and Half-Life 2, as well as Portal and Portal 2, have in particular been cited by numerous publications in being considered among the greatest video games ever made.

== Games ==
Release timeline
1998	Half-Life
1999	Half-Life: Uplink
1999	Half-Life: Opposing Force
2000
2001	Half-Life: Blue Shift
2001	Half-Life: Decay
2002
2003
2004	Half-Life: Source
2004	Half-Life 2
2004	Half-Life 2: Deathmatch
2005	Half-Life 2: Lost Coast
2006	Half-Life Deathmatch: Source
2006	Half-Life 2: Episode One
2007	Half-Life 2: Episode Two
2008
2009
2010
2011
2012
2013
2014
2015
2016
2017
2018
2019
2020	Half-Life: Alyx

=== Half-Life ===
Valve's first product, Half-Life, was released on November 19, 1998, and published by Sierra On-Line for Windows. Players control Gordon Freeman, a theoretical physicist at the Black Mesa Research Facility, where an experiment accidentally causes a dimensional rift and triggers an alien invasion. Unlike many other games at the time, the player has almost uninterrupted control of Freeman, and the story is told mostly through scripted sequences. Half-Life received acclaim for its graphics, gameplay and seamless narrative. It won over 50 "Game of the Year" awards and is considered one of the most influential FPS games and one of the best video games ever made.

==== Uplink ====
On February 12, 1999 a demo version of Half-life featuring a chapter not found in the full game was released as Half-Life Uplink. In the game set in an alternate timeline to the base game Gordon Freeman reconfigures a transmitter in order to enter the Lambda Reactor Complex. However upon entering the complex he is trapped with a large Gargantua in a room and cannot escape.

==== Opposing Force ====
Half-Life was followed by an expansion pack, Opposing Force, on November 1, 1999, developed by Gearbox Software. Players experience a second perspective on the Black Mesa incident through US Marine corporal Adrian Shephard, who fights a new group of aliens known as Race X as well as black operations units.

Opposing Force was received favorably by critics, many citing the game as being as influential on setting expansion pack standards as the original game had been in influencing the overall genre. The game won the Computer Game of the Year Interactive Achievement Award of 2000 from the Academy of Interactive Arts & Sciences.

==== Blue Shift ====
Gearbox went on to develop Blue Shift, Half-Life's second expansion pack. Like Opposing Force, Blue Shift was published by Sierra Entertainment. Announced in 2000, the game was initially developed as a bonus campaign for the Dreamcast port of Half-Life; however, the port was cancelled and Blue Shift was instead released for Windows on June 12, 2001.

Blue Shift puts the player in the position of Barney Calhoun, a security guard working at Black Mesa. The game takes place within the early parts of Half-Life, with Calhoun attempting to escape the facility with a small group of scientists. Blue Shift also includes a High Definition pack, which upgrades the quality of the models and textures in Blue Shift as well as Half-Life, Opposing Force, and Team Fortress. Critics praised the atmosphere and new graphics, but noticed the lack of new content and short length.

==== Decay ====
The third expansion for Half-Life was Decay. The game was again developed by Gearbox and published by Sierra. However, unlike previous games, Decay was released exclusively with the PlayStation 2 version of Half-Life. Decay is unique within the Half-Life series as the only cooperative game—two players must work together to progress through the game. Decay focuses on two of Freeman's colleagues, Gina Cross and Colette Green, as the two work with other scientists to counter the effects of the dimensional rift and ultimately attempt to close it.

Released on November 14, 2001, Decay received a weak but overall positive reception from critics, many reviewers stating that it was fun to play through with a friend, but that the game's more puzzle-oriented gameplay detracted from the overall experience. An unofficial Windows port was released in September 2008.

=== Half-Life 2 ===
On November 16, 2004, Valve released Half-Life 2. The game had a six-year development cycle, which saw several delays and the leak of the game's source code in October, 2003. Half-Life 2 returns the player to the role of Gordon Freeman. Set twenty years after the original game, Earth has been occupied by the Combine, a transdimensional race that exploited the events of the first game to invade. The G-Man inserts Freeman into City 17 in Eastern Europe to combat the Combine occupation. Considered one of the greatest video games of all time, Half-Life 2 was praised for its advances in computer animation, sound, narration, computer graphics, artificial intelligence and physics, and won more than 35 Game of the Year awards. Half-Life 2 was the first game to use Valve's Steam content delivery system, a system that eventually led to Valve falling out with publisher Sierra Entertainment.

==== Lost Coast ====
On October 27, 2005, Valve released Lost Coast, an additional level demonstrating high-dynamic-range rendering (HDR). Consisting of a single map, Lost Coast is based on a cut segment of Half-Life 2. The player, as Freeman, climbs a cliff to destroy a Combine artillery launcher in a monastery.

==== Episode One ====
In May 2006, Valve announced a trilogy of episodic games that would continue the Half-Life 2 story, with the final episode planned for release by Christmas 2007. Valve's president, Gabe Newell, said the approach would allow Valve to release products more quickly after the six-year Half-Life 2 development, and that he considered the trilogy the equivalent of Half-Life 3. According to Newell, where Half-Life saw the G-Man transform Freeman into his tool, and Half-Life 2 saw Freeman being used by G-Man, the episodes would see G-Man lose control.

Episode One was released on June 1, 2006. The player controls Freeman as he and Alyx escape City 17 before a dark energy reactor core destroys it. It introduced several graphical effects, including new lighting features and more advanced facial animation. The story focuses on Alyx. Episode One received a generally positive critical reaction, although the short length was a common point of criticism.

==== Episode Two ====
Episode Two was released for Windows, Xbox 360 and PlayStation 3 on October 10, 2007, as part of the compilation The Orange Box. It was distributed digitally on Steam and at retail by Electronic Arts. Episode Two focuses on expansive environments, travel and less linear play. As Freeman, the player travels with Alyx into the surrounding countryside, pursued by Combine forces. Episode Two's new technologies and gameplay features were praised by reviewers; however, though it was significantly longer than Episode 1, the length was again a point of criticism.

=== Half-Life: Alyx ===
Valve released Half-Life: Alyx, a virtual reality (VR) game, on March 23, 2020, for Windows. In this prequel to Half-Life 2, players control Alyx as she and her father Eli establish the resistance against the Combine in City 17. Described by Valve as its "flagship" VR game, it was developed using the Source 2 engine and supports all PC-compatible VR headsets. Players use VR to interact with the environment and fight enemies, using gravity gloves to manipulate objects, similarly to the gravity gun from Half-Life 2. Alyx was released to acclaim. Reviewers at publications such as VG247, Tom's Hardware and Video Games Chronicle described it as VR's "killer app".

=== Unreleased games ===
Several Half-Life games have been canceled, including Half-Life 2: Episode Three, a version of Half-Life 3, and games developed by Junction Point Studios and Arkane Studios.

=== Related games ===
==== Portal series ====
The Portal series is a series of puzzle games developed by Valve which takes place in the same universe as the Half-Life games. The first game, Portal, was released on October 10, 2007, followed by Portal 2 on April 19, 2011. The Half-Life writer, Marc Laidlaw, opposed the crossover with Portal, feeling it "made both universes smaller", and said later: "I just had to react as gracefully as I could to the fact that it was going there without me. It didn't make any sense except from a resource-restricted point of view."

==== Counter-Strike series ====
In April 2000, Valve acquired the rights to the fan-made modification Counter-Strike. After some cooperation between the original team and Valve's developers, Valve sold the game in retail, retitled Half-Life: Counter-Strike. Set in various locations around the world with little connection to the events of the main Half-Life story, the game is a multiplayer shooter in which players assume the roles of members of combating teams of the governmental counter-terrorist forces and various terrorist militants opposing them. Due to originally being a mod of Half-Life, the game shared several assets with the 1998 game, including Black Mesa containers, vehicles and scientists, with the Black Mesa logos visible in several maps in the retail version implicitly setting them in the same universe. It was bundled with Half-Life in many subsequent packages, including Half-Life: Platinum Pack and Half-Life: Platinum.

When Half-Life: Counter-Strike was remade as Counter-Strike: Source, it was bundled in all retail versions of Half-Life 2, as well as all of the initial digital versions. Some game journalists referred to it as "Half-Life 2's multiplayer version." Both the standard retail edition and the Bronze digital edition of Half-Life 2 came with Counter-Strike: Source, while the retail Collector's Edition and the digital Gold edition also included Day of Defeat: Source and Half-Life: Source. Half-Life: Counter-Strike spawned its own series which gradually became separate from the main Half-Life games, bar occasional references (such as an Easter egg referencing Portal present in Counter-Strike: Global Offensive).

==== Black Mesa ====
Black Mesa is a third-party remake of the original Half-Life, developed and published by Crowbar Collective and made in the Source engine. Originally published as a free mod in September 2012, it was approved by Valve for a commercial release. It was fully released on March 6, 2020, for Windows and Linux. It was praised by reviewers, who likened it to an official Valve game. On the review aggregator OpenCritic, Black Mesa had an average 87/100 review score with 100% approval rating based on 14 reviews.

==== Third-party games ====
The success of the Half-Life series has spurred the creation of several spin-off games for Half-Life 2. Codename Gordon (sometimes called Codename: Gordon) is a two-dimensional Flash sidescroller shooter developed by NuclearVision, and was released over Valve's Steam online delivery system on May 18, 2004, as a promotional game for the then-upcoming Half-Life 2.

Characters from Half-Life have appeared in other games. Peggle Extreme, a special edition of Peggle bundled with the PC version of The Orange Box features levels based on Half-Life 2, Team Fortress 2 and Portal. The headcrab is also an unlockable character in Super Meat Boy when bought on Steam. The Headcrab also appeared in an April Fools event in the MMO Vindictus as an event item along with the Crowbar, possibly due to the game being created on the Source Engine as well. In the game Magicka there is a playable character (after the addition of a DLC), which closely resembles the original zombie from the Half-Life universe, equipped with a crowbar. Gordon also appears in Renegade Ops and the headcrab is available as a pet in Torchlight 2.

Half-Life has also inspired a number of fan-made mods, some which have gained recognition on their own. Garry's Mod started as a sandbox mode using Half-Life 2 assets but since has become a commercial product and given users the ability to incorporate other assets. Among notable fan-made campaigns is Minerva, which was designed to extend the story from Half-Life 2.

== Setting ==
The Half-Life franchise has received critical praise for its in-depth fictional universe, including numerous characters who would go on to become well known in the gaming sphere. The original Half-Life introduces Gordon Freeman, a theoretical physicist working at the Black Mesa Research Facility who serves as the main silent playable protagonist for the franchise. Freeman is hired and put into stasis by the G-Man, an enigmatic and questionable businessman with capabilities and powers beyond any ordinary human being. The expansion packs to the original game introduce other protagonists and characters, such as Corporal Adrian Shephard in Half-Life: Opposing Force and Black Mesa security guard Barney Calhoun in Half-Life: Blue Shift (who reappears in the Half-Life 2 games). Half-Life 2 and the games following it introduce a new, more focused cast of characters fighting the oppressive Combine Empire. This includes Alyx Vance, a prominent member of the Resistance and the daughter of former Black Mesa scientist Eli Vance. Alyx is the protagonist of Half-Life: Alyx.

The games have depicted numerous alien races and creatures, many from the Xen border world. Some of the most notable include the Vortigaunts, a highly intelligent alien race that often assists Freeman after he saves them from oppression, and headcrabs, parasitic aliens who latch on to heads and convert humans into mindless zombies, sometimes used as biological weapons. Other alien species depicted include antlions, human-sized burrowing insectoids; bullsquids, acid-shooting tentacled predators; and barnacles, ceiling-dwelling amorphous creatures who capture others with their sticky tongue.

The series' main recurring symbol is the Greek lambda. It first appears in Half-Life on Freeman's HEV suit and as the namesake of the Lambda Complex responsible for teleporting Freeman to Xen to shut the portal. It reappears in Half-Life 2 as the symbol of the anti-Combine resistance.

== Development ==
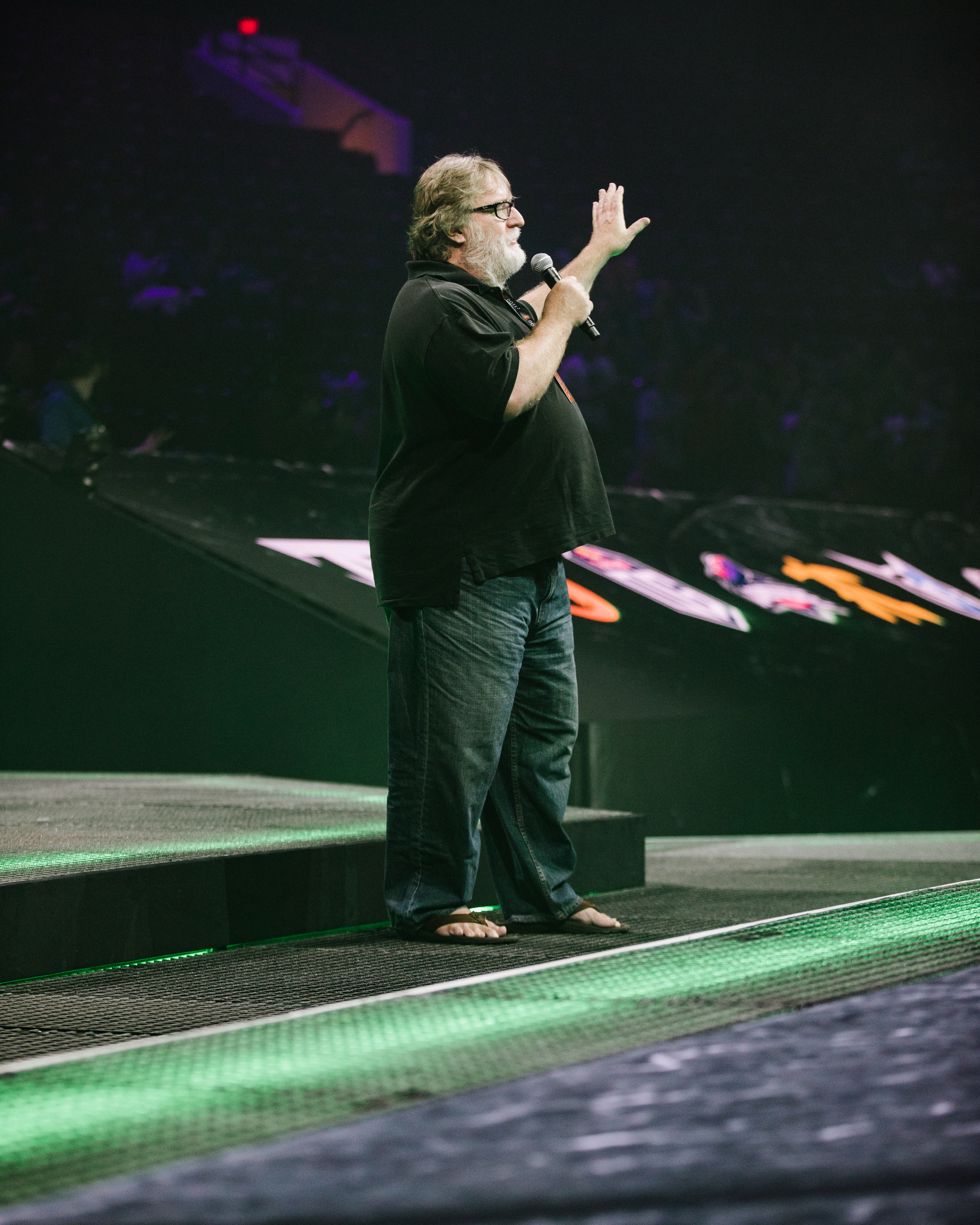
Valve's co-founder Gabe Newell at The International 2018

The developer of the Half-Life series, Valve, was founded in 1996 in Kirkland, Washington by the former Microsoft employees Mike Harrington and Gabe Newell. Valve began working on the first Half-Life soon after formation, and settled on a concept for a horror-themed 3D action game, using the Quake engine as licensed by id Software. The game was a hit at the 1997 E3 convention, where its animation system and artificial intelligence were demonstrated.

The success led to its first expansion pack, Half-Life: Opposing Force, which was developed by Gearbox Software, a new company based in Plano, Texas, and announced on April 15, 1999. The Gearbox founder, Randy Pitchford, said Valve gave them the project to allow Valve to focus on future games. Opposing Force was demonstrated at the 1999 E3 convention, where new locations, characters and the story were revealed.

The second Half-Life expansion pack, Half-Life: Blue Shift, was again developed by Gearbox Software and announced by its publisher, Sierra Entertainment, on August 30, 2000. Sierra intended to release Blue Shift for the Dreamcast, and it was set to include higher detail models and textures that were double the polygon count of the models from Half-Life. However, after several months of delays, Sierra terminated the Dreamcast version of Blue Shift on June 16, 2001, and instead released it for Windows on June 12. Afterward, Gearbox began working on a Half-Life game for the PlayStation 2. The game, Decay, was showcased at E3 2001, where Gearbox demonstrated the game's use of new model sets, which were around twice as detailed as those in Blue Shift.

External videos
- Half-Life: 25th Anniversary Documentary by Valve
- Half-Life 2: 20th Anniversary Documentary by Valve

For several years, Valve secretly worked on Half-Life 2. Valve developed a new game engine, Source. It comes packaged with a heavily modified version of the Havok physics engine that allows for an extra dimension of interactivity in both single-player and online environments. In the episodic games that followed Half-Life 2, Valve made minor tweaks to the game's engine. In Episode One, Valve modified Alyx's AI to allow her to react to player actions. The game runs on an upgraded version of Valve's proprietary Source engine, and features both the engine's advanced lighting effects, and a new version of its facial animation/expression technology.

The designer Robin Walker said Valve used Half-Life games to "solve some interesting collision of technology and art that had reared itself". For the original Half-Life, they expanded the role of narrative in FPS games; for Half-Life 2, they explored characters and physics systems, and refined these ideas in the Half-Life 2 episodes. Valve made several attempts to develop further Half-Life games, but could not settle on a direction and its flat management structure made it difficult for projects to gain momentum. Walker said Valve failed to find a unifying idea that provided a sense of "wonderment, or opening, or expansion". In January 2016, Laidlaw left Valve. He said he had tired of the FPS genre and that he had "always hoped that we'd stumble into a more expansive vocabulary or grammar for storytelling within the FPS medium, one that would let you do more than shoot or push buttons, or push crates".

In the mid-2010s, Valve began experimenting with virtual reality (VR). They built prototypes using their various intellectual properties such as Portal, and found that Half-Life best suited VR. Their flagship VR game, Half-Life: Alyx, entered production using Valve's new Source 2 engine in 2016, with the largest team in Valve's history, including members of Campo Santo, a studio Valve acquired in 2018.

== Film ==
On February 6, 2013, while speaking at the 2013 DICE conference about storytelling in games and film, J. J. Abrams and Gabe Newell announced that they had plans for a game and a film collaboration. Abrams said, "There's an idea we have for a game that we'd like to work with Valve on," while Newell said, "We're going to figure out if we can make a Portal movie or Half-Life movie together". In an interview in March 2016, Abrams stated that while he has been working on many other projects since, he still has plans to direct these films in the future, with both films in the writing stage.

=== Half-Life: Uplink ===
A short film, Half-Life: Uplink, (which is unrelated to the demo of the same name) was developed by Cruise Control, a British marketing agency, and released on March 15, 1999. However, Sierra withdrew it from circulation after Sierra and Valve had failed to resolve licensing issues with Cruise Control over the film. The critical reception of the film was very poor. The film's plot was that of a journalist attempting to infiltrate the Black Mesa Research Facility and discover what was happening there.

=== Half-Life: Escape from City 17 ===
In early 2009, the Purchase Brothers, a Toronto-based film company, released a five-minute film based on Half-Life 2: Episode One, Half-Life: Escape from City 17. The film combines live-action footage with 3D animation created using the Source SDK. It was well received by Valve. On August 25, 2010, they released a nearly 15-minute-long sequel.

=== Beyond Black Mesa ===
In late 2010, a trailer for a Half-Life inspired independent short film, Beyond Black Mesa, was released. Directed by Brian Curtin, it follows the character Adrian Shephard. The full short film was released online on January 21, 2011.

== Sales ==
In late 2008, Valve released lifetime retail sales figures as part of a company profile in Game Informer magazine. The two main Half-Life games had sold 15.8 million units at retail (9.3 million for the first, 6.5 million for the second), while the Half-Life expansions had sold 1.9 million (Opposing Force: 1.1 million, Blue Shift: 800,000) and Half-Life 2 expansions 1.4 million units (all for Episode One) by the end of November 2008.

Additionally, The Orange Box, which included Half-Life 2 and both of its episodic expansions, sold 3 million units at retail by November 2008. This put franchise sales at around 18.8 million full games (Half-Life: 9.3m, Half-Life 2: 6.5m) and approximately 6.3 million expansions (Opposing Force: 1.1m, Blue Shift: 0.8m, Episode One: 1.4m, Episode 2: 3.0m) at the same month.

These figures did not account for digital sales. Half-Life: Counter-Strike sold 4.2 million units standalone by the same time, while its remake, Counter-Strike: Source was bundled with every sold retail copy of Half-Life 2. Forbes reported that, including digital sales, Half-Life 2 had sold over 12 million copies by February 2011.

== See also ==
- Characters of the Half-Life series
