= Half-Life: Opposing Force =

1999 video game

- North America cover art, depicting the game's protagonist, Adrian Shephard
- Developer: Gearbox Software
- Publisher: Sierra Studios
- Director: Randy Pitchford
- Producer: Randy Pitchford
- Designer: Rob Heironimus
- Programmer: John Faulkenbury
- Artist: Brian Martel
- Writers: Stephen Bahl; Rob Heironimus; Kristy Junio; Randy Pitchford
- Composer: Chris Jensen
- Series: Half-Life
- Engine: GoldSrc
- Platforms: Windows, OS X, Linux
- Release: November 19, 1999: Windows; NA: November 19, 1999; EU: December 3, 1999; OS X, Linux; WW: July 31, 2013
- Genre: First-person shooter
- Modes: Single-player, multiplayer

Half-Life: Opposing Force is an expansion pack for the first-person shooter game Half-Life (1998). It was developed by Gearbox Software and published by Sierra On-Line for Windows on November 19, 1999. Opposing Force was the first expansion for Half-Life and was announced in April 1999. Lead designer Randy Pitchford believed Gearbox was selected to develop Opposing Force because Valve, the creators of Half-Life, wanted to concentrate on their future projects. Over the course of development, Gearbox brought in a variety of talent from other areas of the video games industry to help bolster various aspects of design.

Opposing Force portrays the events of Half-Life from the perspective of a U.S. Marine, one of the enemy characters in the original, assigned to the Hazardous Environment Combat Unit (HECU). The player character, Adrian Shephard, is sent in to neutralize the Black Mesa Research Facility when a scientific mishap causes it to be invaded by aliens, but quickly finds that the Marines are outnumbered and slowly being beaten back by a second alien race and black operations units.

Opposing Force was received well by critics, with many describing it as the new benchmark title for expansion packs, in a similar fashion to how Half-Life revolutionized the first-person shooter genre. Other reviewers, however, thought that, despite its accomplishments, it still suffered from the negative aspects of other expansion packs.

== Gameplay ==
Opposing Force introduces new weapons and allows the player to command small squads of soldiers.

As an expansion pack for Half-Life, Opposing Force is a first-person shooter. The overall gameplay of Opposing Force does not significantly differ from that of Half-Life. Players navigate through levels, fight hostile non-player characters and solve a variety of puzzles to advance. The game continues Half-Life's methods of an unbroken narrative. The player sees everything through the first person perspective of the protagonist and remains in control of the player character for almost all of the game. Story events are conveyed through the use of scripted sequences rather than cut scenes. Progress through the world is continuous; although the game is divided up into chapters, the only significant pauses are when the game needs to load the next part of an environment. Opposing Force also features an extended multiplayer, incorporating the various new environments and weapons into the original deathmatch mode used in Half-Life. After release, a new capture the flag mode with additional levels, items and powerups, was created by Gearbox.

For the most part the player battles through the single-player game alone, but is occasionally assisted by friendly non-player characters. Security guards and scientists will occasionally help the player in reaching new areas and convey relevant plot information. However, Opposing Force also features fellow U.S. Marines who will assist the player in combat to a far greater degree than security guards. Three types of Marines are featured in the game: the soldier will simply provide fire support for the player with a submachine gun, shotgun or machine gun, the combat medic is capable of healing the player and other non-player characters, while the engineer can cut through doors and remove obstacles, allowing the player and their squad to proceed unhindered. A selection of enemies from Half-Life populate the game, including alien creatures such as headcrabs and Vortigaunts.

A variety of new alien non-player characters, labelled "Race X", appear as well. The player also encounters human opponents in the form of a detachment of black operations units who have been sent to destroy the base in the wake of the failure of the U.S. Marines to eliminate the alien threat. A limited selection of Half-Life's weaponry is allocated to the player to defend themselves with, although several new weapons such as a sniper rifle, combat knife and a variety of alien weaponry are also present.

== Synopsis ==
=== Setting ===
Opposing Force builds on the setting and events of Half-Life, taking place at a remote New Mexico laboratory called the Black Mesa Research Facility. In Half-Life, the player takes on the role of Gordon Freeman, a scientist involved in an accident that opens an interdimensional portal to the borderworld of Xen, allowing the alien creatures of Xen to attack the facility. The player controls Freeman in an attempt to escape the facility and close the portal, ultimately traveling to Xen to do so. Opposing Force, however, shows the events of Half-Life from the perspective of a different protagonist. The player assumes the role of Adrian Shephard, a U.S. Marine Corps Corporal assigned to the Hazardous Environment Combat Unit, a specialized unit sent in to Black Mesa by the government to quell the alien threat and silence all witnesses. However, after Shephard becomes isolated from his fellow Marines, he must ally with the Black Mesa personnel and attempt to escape the base.

=== Plot ===
Opposing Force opens with Shephard riding on a V-22 Osprey with his squad. His squad discuss their deployment, somewhat irritated that they have not been told what they are being deployed for. However, as they are nearing their landing zone at Black Mesa, airborne alien creatures attack the Osprey formation, causing Shephard's Osprey to crash land. Shephard regains consciousness in a Black Mesa medical bay, tended to by the science team, learning that the Marines are being steadily beaten by the alien forces from Xen and orders have come through to pull out. Consequently, Shephard departs to reach an extraction point and escape the facility. However, Shephard is prevented from reaching the extraction point by the enigmatic G-Man, resulting in the evacuation craft leaving without him.

Other Marines who have also been left behind team up with Shephard and attempt to reach another extraction point near Black Mesa's Lambda Complex, but en route they come under attack from black operations units seeking to thoroughly contain the situation and eliminate all survivors. Shephard makes it to the Lambda Complex alive, and briefly sees Gordon Freeman as the latter teleports to Xen in the final stages of Half-Life. To escape the teleportation chamber, Shephard is forced to enter a separate portal, briefly taking him to Xen before depositing him in an entirely different area of the facility. The facility is now heavily damaged, and it soon becomes clear that a new alien race, Race X, has exploited the situation to mount a localized invasion, attacking both human and Xen forces in Black Mesa indiscriminately. Fighting between the black operations units and Race X quickly intensifies.

Shephard encounters more stranded Marine units in the wreckage of Black Mesa, and attempts to reach an unknown exit route, encountering heavy resistance from Race X and black operations units. A surviving Black Mesa security guard reveals to Shephard that the black operators intend to detonate a tactical nuclear weapon in the base, thereby totally sealing it off and killing everything in it. After neutralizing the black ops unit guarding the device, Shephard disarms it and proceeds to a nearby storage facility to attempt another escape. As Shephard departs, the G-Man rearms the nuclear device. The storage facility has become a battleground between Race X and the black operation units. Although Shephard manages to evade them, he is informed by another security guard that something very large is coming through an alien portal blocking the exit path.

At the portal, Shephard discovers a gene worm, a massive creature facilitating the Race X invasion. Shephard is able to wound the creature enough to force it back through the wormhole, but immediately afterwards he is teleported onto an Osprey by the G-Man. As the G-Man congratulates Shephard on his accomplishments, the nuclear device detonates in the background, destroying Black Mesa. The game closes with the G-Man detaining Shephard someplace where he can tell no one of what he has seen and cannot be harmed, pending further evaluation.

== Development ==
Half-Life: Opposing Force was announced by developer Gearbox Software on April 15, 1999. In their press release, founder Randy Pitchford stated that "our number one goal is to preserve the integrity of Half-Life and provide new experiences that expand upon the sensation of the original". The name Opposing Force has a double meaning, referring both to the fact that the player is one of the enemies in the original game, as well as to Newton's third law of motion. In a later interview, Pitchford stated that he believed that Valve offered Gearbox the chance to make a Half-Life expansion was from a wish "to focus on their future titles". In addition, Pitchford commented that Valve and Gearbox had agreed not to "severely modify" the game engine used by Half-Life and Opposing Force as it "risks breaking all of the wonderful work" that the game's custom content community was creating. Substantial information on Opposing Force's development direction, as well as new locations, characters and story were revealed at the 1999 Electronic Entertainment Expo convention. The official website for Opposing Force, hosted by publisher Sierra Studios, was put online in July 1999. Opposing Force was developed in 8 months by a team of more than 15 people.

Over the course of development, Gearbox acquired various outside talent to assist in designing some aspects. In June 1999, Gearbox announced that level designer Richard Gray would be assisting in developing the multiplayer aspects. Several other designers subsequently joined the project in September 1999, with collective experience from the development of Daikatana, Quake II, Doom and Shadow Warrior. In the subsequent two months, media releases displaying a variety of screenshots were unveiled. The game was released on November 19, 1999. Gearbox later released a multiplayer update in May 2000, adding a capture the flag mode, along with various items to accompany the new mode. Opposing Force was later released on Valve's Steam content delivery system. Opposing Force was published as part of Sierra's Half-Life: Generation compilation in 2002, and as part of Valve and Electronic Arts' Half-Life 1: Anthology on September 26, 2005.

== Reception ==
Reception

Aggregate score
Aggregator	Score
GameRankings	85.45% (30 reviews)

Review scores
Publication	Score
Computer and Video Games	9/10
Eurogamer	7/10
GameFan	85/100
GamePro	5/5
GameSpot	9/10
IGN	7.5/10
PC Zone	85%

Award
Publication	Award
Academy of Interactive Arts & Sciences	Computer Action Game of the Year, 2000

Opposing Force received mainly positive reviews, holding a score of 85.45% on the review aggregator site GameRankings. In the United States, the game sold 108,008 copies by the end of 1999. Although figures for sales on Steam have not been released, Opposing Force eventually sold over 1.1 million copies at retail.

Computer and Video Games reviewer Kim Randell noted that "Gearbox has obviously gone to great pains to provide a similar experience to the original". Praise was also given to the multiplayer; Randell stated that the new additions for multiplayer made it the area of Opposing Force that "really shines". Randell closed the review by concluding that Opposing Force is "an awesome achievement". Erik Wolpaw, writing for GameSpot, noted that as most expansion packs were mediocre, "it's appropriate that Gearbox Software's Opposing Force, the official expansion for the genre-redefining Half-Life, in turn sets a new standard of quality for future action-game mission packs". Wolpaw praised the design of the single-player campaign, commenting that "you can sense the designers' enthusiasm as one memorable scene unfolds after another, and it compels you to keep playing". Although criticizing some elements of the artificial intelligence and describing some of the new models as "merely window dressing", the review concluded that Opposing Force was an "impassioned application of creative design".

GamePro stated that "Gearbox has done one hell of a job in creating not just an add-on for Half-Life, but a continuation of a masterpiece", praising both level design and story elements, but noted that it was a little too short. However, some critics dissented on the idea that Opposing Force was as influential as other reviewers made out.

PC Zone stated that "the taste left in the mouth is a bitter one", noting that "Opposing Force is a few excellent ideas strung together by pedestrian Half-Life padding", but concluded that "it was still a good weekend's worth of entertainment". Eurogamer stated that Opposing Force still had similar problems to other expansion packs, commenting that "X amount of new content has been created and it is going to be cut into the old content in a linear way to make it look like an all new game", but noted that "fortunately though the new stuff in Opposing Force... is pretty damn good". Although praising the level design as the game's strongest point, the reviewer felt that "towards the end of the game... they were running out of development time". Reviewing for IGN, Vincent Lopez stated that the game "does a fantastic job of making you remember exactly why you enjoyed the original so much", but criticized this as the biggest drawback, commenting that "you may find yourself wishing for a more original experience", but concluded that "for good, and bad: it's good to be back".

The game won several publication awards, as well as "Computer Action Game of the Year" from the Academy of Interactive Arts & Sciences during the 3rd Annual Interactive Achievement Awards. The editors of PC Gamer US presented Opposing Force with their 1999 "Best Expansion Pack" award, and nominated it as 1999's overall best game of the year, although it lost the latter prize to Homeworld. They wrote that Opposing Force "makes history by becoming the first expansion pack to be considered for Game of the Year. Yes, it really is that good."
