= Junction Point Studios =

American video game developer

- Type: Subsidiary
- Industry: Video games
- Founded: November 2004; 22 years ago
- Founder: Warren Spector
- Defunct: 29 January 2013; 13 years ago
- Fate: Dissolved
- Headquarters: Austin, Texas, U.S.
- Key people: Warren Spector; Art Min
- Products: Epic Mickey; Epic Mickey 2: The Power of Two
- Number of employees: 160 (2012)
- Parent: Disney Interactive Studios
- Website: junctionpoint.com

Junction Point Studios (JPS) was an American video game developer based in Austin, Texas founded by Deus Ex creator, Warren Spector, in 2004. Disney Interactive Studios acquired Junction Point Studios in July 2007 to develop a property based on Oswald the Lucky Rabbit, a character created by Walt Disney but owned by Universal Studios until the character was acquired by The Walt Disney Company from Universal in 2006. The studio was closed in 2013.

== History ==
The studio was established in November 2004 by Warren Spector and Art Min. The new studio is based around several former employees of Ion Storm, where Spector and Min previously worked.

From inception up until their acquisition by Disney Interactive Studios, Junction Point was working on a Source Engine based game that was to be distributed on Valve's Steam distribution network. This was later revealed to be a new game in Valve's Half-Life series which was cancelled when Junction Point was acquired.

Junction Point developed Epic Mickey, a Wii game which was released on November 25, 2010 in Europe and on November 30 in North America. The game is about Mickey Mouse's adventure in Wasteland, a world where forgotten characters like Oswald the Lucky Rabbit live. Junction Point has indicated that its game will be a "combination of action and roleplaying, traditional narrative and player choice", and will use Emergent Game Technologies' Gamebryo engine. The game has been developed for the Wii console.

On March 21, 2012, Warren Spector announced that a sequel, Epic Mickey 2: The Power of Two, was in development for Wii and Wii U.

On January 29, 2013, Disney Interactive Studios confirmed the closure of the studio.

Before its closure, Junction Point was working on a video game called Project Goliath.

== Name ==
In March 2007, Spector explained the name in an interview:

When I was with Looking Glass, the last thing I worked on with them on was a concept that I came up with along with Doug Church and some other guys. It was a very different approach to multiplayer online games called Junction Point. I loved the name and concept. I'm not revealing anything too dramatic since we're not doing the game, though I'd love to some day, but the name spoke to me more as a name for a studio than a name for a game. ... It's also nice that it abbreviates to JPS, which rolls off the tongue.

== Games developed ==
Year	Game	Platform(s)
Cancelled	Untitled Half-Life 2 episode	Windows
Cancelled	Sleeping Giants	Windows, PlayStation 3, Xbox 360
2010	Epic Mickey	Wii
2012	Epic Mickey 2: The Power of Two	Windows, PlayStation 3, Vita, Xbox 360, Wii, Wii U

== See also ==
- List of companies based in Austin, Texas
