= Alyx Vance =

Video game character

- Half-Life character
- Alyx as she appears in Half-Life 2
- First game: Half-Life 2 (2004)
- Designed by: Dhabih Eng
- Voiced by: Merle Dandridge; Ozioma Akagha (Half-Life: Alyx)
- Motion capture: Jamil Mullen

Alyx Vance is a fictional character from Valve's Half-Life video game series. She is introduced as a non-playable, supporting character in Half-Life 2 (2004), accompanying the player's character, Gordon Freeman, throughout much of the game. She subsequently appears in a similar capacity in Half-Life 2: Episode One (2006) and Episode Two (2007), and as the titular protagonist of the VR game Half-Life: Alyx (2020).

Alyx is portrayed as a 24-year-old young woman of Afro-Asian descent, and is a prominent figure in the human resistance against the rule of the alien empire called the Combine and their human representative, Dr. Wallace Breen. She is the daughter of resistance leader Dr. Eli Vance, and becomes a close friend and ally of Gordon. She received highly positive reviews from critics.

== Character design ==
An early concept drawing of Alyx

Alyx Vance was created for the video game Half-Life 2, and her design was created by Dhabih Eng. Her motions are performed by actress Jamil Mullen, who also provides the face design. She is voiced by Merle Dandridge in Half-Life 2 and its episodes, and Ozioma Akagha in Half-Life: Alyx.

According to Half-Life writer Marc Laidlaw, the relationship between Alyx and the G-Man was based on the relationship between Elena Hausmann and Slowstop from his novel The Third Force: A Novel of Gadget (1996), based on Synergy's computer game Gadget: Invention, Travel, & Adventure (1993).

== Appearances ==
Alyx appears in the video game Half-Life 2 as a recurring ally to protagonist Gordon Freeman, and the daughter of Eli Vance, all of whom operate as members of the Resistance. She is first encountered when she saves Gordon from an attack, and later gives him the gravity gun (a tool used to manipulate objects) while playing with her robot, Dog. She helps Gordon through various incidents, including helping rescue her father and defeating one of the game's antagonists, Wallace Breen. She also has disputes with the character Judith Mossman, who later betrays them before they eventually make peace and work together. She ultimately becomes separated from Gordon after the G-Man stops time during a dark energy explosion at the Citadel, removing Gordon from that point in time and leaving Alyx.

In the expansion, Half-Life 2: Episode One, it's revealed that Alyx was rescued by Vortigaunts, who also retrieve Gordon from G-Man, leaving them both outside the Citadel. They work together to delay the explosion by slowing the core's progression toward meltdown. They later go through a zombie-infested underground station and later working with Barney Calhoun to rescue members of the rebellion before the Citadel explodes.

In Half-Life 2: Episode Two, Alyx and Gordon travel to the White Forest Rocket Facility to deliver a crucial information packet stolen from the Citadel. Along the way, she is gravely wounded by a Combine Hunter. Healing her requires Gordon to make a dangerous trek through an Antlion colony to retrieve their "larval extract," an essential ingredient in the Vortigaunt healing process. As part of the healing process, her life is entwined with Gordon's. During this time, the G-Man appears to Gordon in a surreal "heart-to-heart" sequence and programs Alyx to tell her father to "prepare for unforeseen consequences." Once Alyx awakens, she and Gordon resume their quest toward White Forest. She delivers the Combine data to Dr. Kleiner, who manages to decrypt it and discover that Judith Mossman has found the legendary Borealis, an icebreaker ship which has disappeared during teleportation experiments. She delivers the message to her father after the G-Man triggers her programming, and later, two creatures called Advisors break in and kill Eli before Dog saves Gordon and Alyx.

Alyx is the titular playable protagonist of the 2020 virtual reality game Half-Life: Alyx developed by Valve. The game follows a 19-year-old Alyx's story in City 17 five years before the events of Half-Life 2. Initially performing routine reconnaissance for the Resistance, Alyx is captured along with her father by the Combine after he discovers images relating to an apparent Combine superweapon called "the Vault." Russell, a Resistance mechanic, frees Alyx and sends her through the zombie-infested Quarantine Zone outside City 17 to rescue Eli. Along the way, Alyx meets an eccentric Vortigaunt who warns her of Eli's death in the future. Alyx manages to derail the train sending Eli to Nova Prospekt before discovering that the Vault is actually a prison containing Gordon Freeman. When Alyx reaches the Vault, however, she instead finds the G-Man, who gives her a vision of her father's death in exchange for freeing him. He gives her the power to kill the Advisor, saving Eli's life, but puts her in stasis to replace Gordon Freeman, causing her to be removed from time.

In 2020, an Alyx-inspired skin was added to the massive multiplayer online obstacle course battle royale game Fall Guys.

== Gameplay ==
In Episode One, where Alyx's role as a companion is expanded upon, her artificial intelligence (AI) was designed specifically for co-operative play to complement the player's abilities. The developers described Alyx's programming for Episode One as a "personality code" as opposed to an "AI code", emphasizing the attention they gave to create a unique and believable companion. In addition, she was specially programmed to avoid performing too many mechanical or repetitive actions, such as repeating lines of dialogue or performing certain routines in combat situations.

Examples of this co-operative gameplay include combat in underground levels, where the player can use their flashlight to help Alyx spot and kill oncoming enemies, thereby conserving their own ammunition. Similarly, Alyx will often take up strategic positions and provide covering fire to keep the player safe while they travel to a certain area or perform certain actions.

== Reception ==
Since she first appeared in Half-Life 2, Alyx Vance has received positive reviews for both her intelligence and her beauty, among other factors. GamesRadar named Alyx "Miss 2004" due to her intelligence, personality, and design. In its 2010 cover feature, Game Informer named Alyx Vance one of 30 most important characters of the 2000s, feeling that she stands apart from female characters who exist for the sake of male characters without putting too much emphasis on her strength and independence. GamesRadar+ staff also considered her one of the best new characters of the decade due to her strong attitude and personality, which they felt was nonstandard for non-playable characters at the time. Entertainment Weekly's Darren Franich considered her one of the best female characters, feeling that she was a vital component to the game due to Gordon being a silent protagonist. In 2013's BioShock Infinite, the player character's female companion Elizabeth was developed by the team to attempt to live up to Alyx Vance in terms of being an AI companion, with developer Ken Levine arguing that AI companions have not been done as well as Alyx.

== See also ==
- List of female action heroes and villains
