= Headcrab =

Video game monster

- Half-Life race
- A Headcrab, as it appears in Half-Life 2
- First appearance: Half-Life (1998)
- Genre: First-person shooter, science fiction, horror

Headcrabs are a parasitoid alien race found in the Half-Life series of video games, originating in 1998's Half-Life. It is a creature that attacks people, trying to latch onto their head. Upon doing so, it begins to take control of their motor functions, turning them into zombie-like creatures that appear to retain their intelligence and emotions despite lacking the ability to express them in this state. The sequel, Half-Life 2, feature multiple new Headcrabs such as fast and poisonous ones, each creating different Headcrab Zombies.

The Half-Life development team was split on making Half-Life: Alyx (2020) a virtual reality game, with the fact that the Headcrabs would be jumping at the player being both an upside and downside depending on the perspective. They initially intended to feature fast Headcrabs and zombies, but opted to not do so when they saw that players struggled too much to deal with them. Critics identified this appearance as particularly terrifying, stating that the inclusion of the Headcrabs justified making the game on a virtual reality platform.

The Headcrabs have been generally well received, considered by multiple critics to be a particularly scary and effective monster. Of particular note was their ability to take control of people's bodies, with one critic commenting that the execution was more akin to The Thing (1982) rather than the zombies from George A. Romero's films.

== Appearances ==
The Headcrab debuted in Half-Life (1998) as an enemy that attacks protagonist Gordon Freeman and other surviving humans by leaping at them and biting them. Headcrabs first appear when a portal is opened, sending various interdimensional beings into the game's world and sending the Black Mesa lab into chaos. Throughout the game, the player encounters bodies with Headcrabs on their head, some of which becoming animated and attacking living people. In the sequel, Half-Life 2, the Headcrab and Headcrab Zombies return in a similar capacity. Headcrabs can be found in various environments, and the main antagonists, the Combine, who have taken control of the world post-invasion, have been attacking civilian and resistance groups by shooting rockets with Headcrabs in them to infect the population. Other Headcrabs appear, including a fast one and a poison one, the latter of which can put Gordon in serious danger if bitten. The character Isaac Kleiner manages to debeak a Headcrab, keeping it as a pet called Lamarr. Headcrabs also appear in Half-Life: Alyx, a virtual reality game. Fast-moving Headcrabs and Zombies were originally considered for inclusion, but were removed due to tests finding that they moved too fast for players to properly react.

Outside of the Half-Life series, the Headcrab makes multiple cameo appearances. Multiple games, such as Vindictus and the Steam releases of Phantasy Star Online 2, Death Stranding, and Fall Guys featured accessories based on the Headcrab. An update to Two Point Hospital (2020) on Steam added a patient suffering from a Headcrab attack, while the Steam release of Super Meat Boy featured a playable Headcrab. The Headcrab has received multiple pieces of merchandise, including a 1/4 scale Headcrab Zombie and a plush.

== Concept and creation ==
Headcrabs are a race of dog-sized alien creatures that leap at people's heads in order to latch onto them and turn them into zombie-like creatures that move slowly. Headcrab-controlled zombies are suggested to retain the capacity for intelligence and emotion without the ability to properly express it. When they regain control after the Headcrab is killed, they are able to speak before death; for instance, when set on fire, the host can say "I am burning. Please God, kill me. I am burning". Early prototypes for the Headcrabs gave them butts and were colored "faecal brown". The first Half-Life features the standard Headcrab, while Half-Life 2 introduces two new Headcrab variations: the fast Headcrab, which creates fast zombies, and the Poison Headcrab, which creates slower and more durable zombies. When designing Half-Life: Alyx, the team was in two camps, with the ability for a Headcrab to jump at the player's face in virtual reality being the reason some supported it and others opposed it. When designing the Headcrab in this game, it was designed to have a percentage chance for it to miss in its leap, thinking this made them more fun to interact with.

== Reception ==
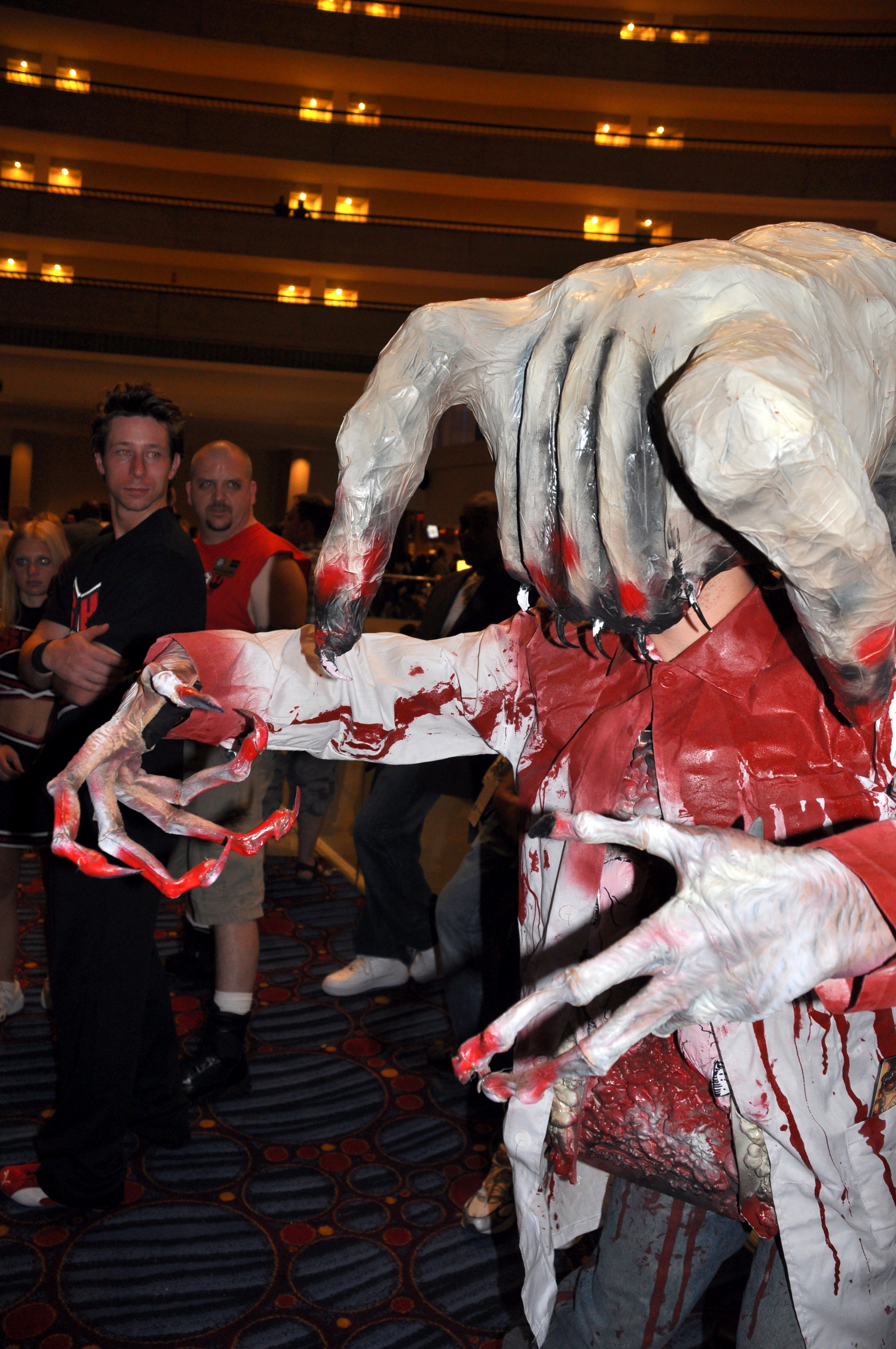
Cosplay of a headcrab zombie

The Headcrabs have received generally positive reception, identified as a series mascot due to existing merchandise. Kotaku writer Levi Winslow regarded encountering Headcrabs in Half-Life as among the most frightening moments in video games; they felt that the name itself was rather frightening, but the sight of it lunging for the player's head disgusted them. They found it particularly disgusting that, once it latches onto a person, it begins to take over their motor functions. Rock Paper Shotgun writer Adam Smith regarded the Headcrabs as among his favorite video game monsters, stating that they have many of the traits of the best monsters, including being small, hiding in dark spaces, leaping at people's faces, and the ability to turn people into zombies. In particular, the weaponization of Headcrabs in Half-Life 2 struck Smith, feeling that it represented a "credible extension" of the Headcrabs' role from Half-Life. He found the Poison Headcrabs to be particularly frightening, stating that he could not talk about them without "lift[ing] my feet onto the chair" out of anxiety of being bitten by one. Describing the Headcrab as "shamelessly ripped off" from the Facehuggers from the Alien series, GamesRadar+ writer Alex Avard felt that it was one of the most terrifying aliens for a multitude of reasons, including its leap attack, what happens if it latches onto a person's head, and the Headcrabs found in Ravenholm.

Vice writer Patrick Klepek felt that the Headcrab was an iconic enemy known by people outside the Half-Life fandom, stating that due to it becoming more familiar, it became less intimidating, citing the fact that it was made into a plush. He felt that the Headcrabs in Half-Life: Alyx were responsible for making Headcrabs scary again, stating that it being a virtual reality game made its attacks that much more frightening. He felt that the Headcrabs being scary served as proof of how well Alyx works as a video game. Dread Central writer Justin Wood felt similarly about the virtual reality technology, stating that the sight of Headcrabs jumping at the player created "visceral reactions", as well as making him uncomfortable to hear them creeping around. Kotaku writer Nathan Grayson stated that, through his time playing Alyx, he had never gotten used to the "nauseating sense of dread" from the fear of being attacked by Headcrabs. He felt that this went beyond just being in virtual reality, praising the development team for managing to create such good sound design and animation that being accosted by Headcrabs inspired genuine fear in him. Twitch producer Mary Kish regarded Alyx as one of her favorite video games of 2020, stating that it being "genuinely scary" was a large part of why she liked it. She discussed how the Headcrabs function in it, which caused her to hold her breath in response to a Headcrab's presence, believing they pulled off a sense of danger well.

Dread Central writer Jay Krieger found that monsters that were "reflective of their singularly unique worlds" were more memorable to him, and felt that there were few better examples of this than the Headcrab. He felt that the zombification they induced was evocative of John Carpenter's The Thing rather than George A. Romero's zombie films. He found the Half-Life 2 iteration of the Headcrab Zombies as particularly shocking, citing how the Headcrab Zombies have muffled screams from the host and, when killed, the Headcrab falls off dead, revealing a face recognizable enough to see the "haunted look of them realizing their fate in their final moments remains". He argued that the zombies of Half-Life served to show the humanity of the Headcrabs' victims. He also believed that the Headcrabs in Ravenholm, particularly the Poison Headcrabs and running zombies, represented how big of a threat Headcrabs could be. Edge staff felt that the running zombie was a memorable video game monster, believing that its "demented wail" was among the most chilling noises in video games. The Headcrab Zombies were described as "walking tragedies" by Rock Paper Shotgun writer Alec Meer, believing that they represented the horror of what zombies are rather than what zombies can do to the player. He appreciated how the game managed to escalate from questioning why the "weak, tiny" Headcrabs were attacking people, to seeing corpses twitching, and finally to seeing someone who was probably still alive but with no control of their body. GamesRadar+ writer Ashley Reed found it harrowing to discover that the Headcrab Zombies were still alive and begging for help.
