= Combine (Half-Life) =

Alien empire from the Half-Life video game series

The Combine
- Half-Life organization
- The Combine "clamp" symbol, seen in propaganda throughout Half-Life 2, its expansions, and Half-Life: Alyx
- First appearance: Half-Life 2
- Created by: Marc Laidlaw

In-universe information
- Type: Inter-dimensional alien conglomerate
- Purpose: Conquest
- Technologies: Inter-dimensional teleportation

The Combine are a fictional multidimensional alien empire which serve as the primary antagonistic force in the 2004 video game Half-Life 2 and its subsequent episodes developed and published by Valve Corporation. The Combine consist of organic, synthetic, and heavily mechanized elements. They are encountered throughout Half-Life 2, Half-Life 2: Episode One, and Half-Life 2: Episode Two, as well as Half-Life: Alyx, as hostile non-player characters as the player progresses through the games in an effort to overthrow the Combine occupation of Earth.

The Combine are depicted as cruel and totalitarian rulers, suppressing dissent with brutality, using systematic violence to police and gradually assimilate humanity into cybernetic machines, rendering humans infertile, and forcibly performing surgery on captured dissenters to transform them into slaves. Throughout the games, player character Gordon Freeman primarily battles transformed humans as well as synthetic and mechanical enemies that are the product of Combine technology. In addition to their role within the Half-Life series, the Combine have been adapted for machinima productions and other works.

The species at the very top of the Combine's hierarchy are heavily implied to be a species of parasitic aliens who can't create nor innovate, despite conquering thousands, if not millions, of planets. All their technology is likely stolen from the multiple other civilisations that they have taken over. More credence to this theory is given by how the Combine struggle with intra-universal teleportation and have to rely on inter-universal travel (point A to point Xen to point B, using Xen as a slingshot), while Dr. Isaac Kleiner and Dr. Eli Vance have constructed teleporters from spare parts and scrap that can travel between Dr. Kleiner's Lab and Black Mesa East (point A to point B, intra-dimensional travel).

== Design ==
Depiction of the Combine's Civil Protection

Certain elements of the Combine's appearance, such as that of the Advisors, are inspired by the works of Frank Herbert. The towering Striders seen throughout Half-Life 2 and its subsequent episodes may be based on the Martian tripods of the H. G. Wells novel The War of the Worlds, where Martians invade Victorian England, using the tripods as their main "weapon", although more closely resemble the tripods seen in the 2005 Steven Spielberg film. The name "Combine" itself is a tribute to Ken Kesey's novel One Flew Over the Cuckoo's Nest, which features a collection of authorities which mechanistically manipulate and process individuals.

During Half-Life 2's development, various concepts for Combine non-player characters were cut. Female Combine Assassins, similar to black ops Assassins featured in the first game, were planned but later abandoned, although they appear in the Half-Life 2: Survivor arcade game. Another non-player character, the Cremator, was conceptualized as a Combine laborer who cleaned the streets of bodies after a battle with a flamethrower. Although removed from the game, its head was featured on a desk in Eli Vance's laboratory in Black Mesa East. Other cuts included a variety of alien Combine soldiers that would have complemented the transhuman soldiers in the game and a number of synthetic combat machines. Many of Half-Life 2's Combine characters went through repeated redesigns; the Combine Overwatch soldier was subjected to at least twelve before the final appearance was decided.

Ellen McLain provides the voice for the Combine Overwatch announcer and dispatcher in Half-Life 2 and its episodic expansions and their virtual reality prequel Half-Life: Alyx. Combine soldiers in Half-Life: Alyx are voiced by actors including Rich Sommer, Isaac C. Singleton Jr., Jason Vande Brake, Michael Schwalbe, Rajia Baroudi, and Rick Zieff.

== Attributes ==
=== Society ===
Little is revealed of the Combine's activities outside of Earth, but dialogue in Half-Life 2 states that they control worlds of various dimensions inhabited by a range of species. The Combine occupation of Earth is shown to be a brutal totalitarian police state. In City 17, an Eastern European city, Civil Protection units routinely conduct searches of apartment blocks, interrogating human citizens, and engaging in wanton police brutality. The military Overwatch forces of the Combine attack human resistance bases in an effort to further solidify their authority in the urban centers. Human citizens are clad in blue uniforms, living in designated apartment blocks and move around to different cities or locales in passenger trains by the Combine's will. Vortigaunts, enemy alien creatures from Half-Life, have also been enslaved, and are observed in various professions such as janitors. According to Half-Life 2: Raising the Bar, the Combine are draining Earth's oceans and resources to be used on other Combine worlds.

The heart of the Combine's command over Earth in Half-Life 2 is the Citadel, a large tower constructed by them which reaches both tens of thousands of feet (several or several tens of kilometres) into the sky and deep underground. Located within City 17, the Citadel serves as the Combine's headquarters on Earth, housing Combine Advisors and the office of Earth's administrator, Dr. Wallace Breen. Breen, a puppet ruler, is frequently seen on large screens around the city on which he spreads propaganda and makes announcements. The Citadel projects an energy field that is able to prevent human reproduction, as well as a field that keeps dangerous alien fauna out of the city. In addition, the Citadel contains a trans-dimensional teleporter which allows the Combine to travel between their native universe and Earth.

=== Depiction ===
The Combine comprises various species and machines. The most commonly encountered enemies throughout Half-Life 2 and its episodic sequels are the transhuman soldiers and human Civil Protection officers. In addition, a variety of combat machines appear, ranging from APCs and helicopter gunships to a giant 'smart wall' enclosing occupied cities and gradually destroying anything in its path, as well as a number of weaponized alien 'synths'.

==== Advisors ====
The Advisor's grub-like appearance was inspired by the works of science fiction author Frank Herbert.

Advisors are large larvae-like aliens which are virtually featureless, with no visible eyes, ears or limbs, although they do possess an eye-like mechanical device attached to the left side of their heads, and detachable mechanical arms. Their faces are covered by a respirator, which is able to lift to reveal a mouth-like orifice from which they can extend a long and flexible tongue. With this, they can examine objects, or attack and kill other creatures. Advisors appear to be feeding upon their victim during their attacks. It is implied that Advisors, despite being the highest-ranked Combine units that appear in the games, aren't actually that high in the Combine hierarchy, and are surprisingly disposable. They are above the administrator, Dr. Wallace Breen, as Dr. Breen is seen answering directly to them. Although Advisors are usually seen in protective pods guarded by Combine soldiers, they also possess telekinesis, with which they are able to float through the air and immobilize other creatures so that their tongues can examine victims without interference. Their appearance was based on the Guild Navigators from the 1984 film Dune.

==== Civil Protection ====
The Civil Protection is the Combine's primary law enforcement agency on Earth, whose ranks are drawn from unmodified, volunteering humans. Commonly referred to as "metrocops" or "CPs", Civil Protection personnel wear light body armor and face masks which resemble a modified PMK gas mask. They also have voice modifiers, masking their normal voices. They typically carry electroshock batons (named stun-sticks in the game) and pistols, and are occasionally equipped with submachine guns. The Civil Protection are frequently brutal in their methods, keeping the local populace in line via intimidation and violence. Interrogations, inspections, raids, random beatings, summary executions and acts of police brutality are all used as a means of policing their jurisdictions; the Civil Protection's methods are justified by their role as "protectors of the civilians' well-being". On the outskirts of City 17, the Civil Protection carry out constant patrols for escapees from the city. Civil Protection personnel are in constant contact with the Combine's Overwatch headquarters, which issues them objectives and situation updates. Upon the death of Civil Protection personnel, their armor detects that its wearer is no longer alive and automatically informs the Overwatch of the fatality.

==== Transhuman forces ====
The transhuman forces is the primary Combine military ground force on Earth. It consists of biomechanically enhanced humans who wear heavy body armor and gas masks. They are armed variously with submachine guns, shotguns, sniper rifles, and pulse rifles. The markings on their uniforms suggest a difference in specialization. Elite soldiers wear bright white armor with one-eyed helmets and can fire a ball of energy from their pulse rifle, while the rank-and-file wear blue, depending on their role as infantry or a shotgunner respectively. Soldiers wielding shotguns wear similar outfits to other transhuman soldiers but are equipped with uniforms coloured brown and helmets with orange (instead of blue) eyes. Overwatch soldiers typically operate in small groups of four to six using infantry tactics and grenades to flush out and flank the player. They occasionally provide support to Combine synths, and often travel to areas by use of dropships and armoured personnel carriers. Transhuman soldiers utilize two-way radios to communicate with each other and with headquarters. The transhuman forces are usually encountered outside City 17, and only appear in the city near the end of the game. They are commanded by the Overwatch, an unencountered artificial female voice which issues orders such as, "Attention ground units. Mission failure will result in permanent off-world assignment. Code reminder: sacrifice, coagulate, clamp."

==== Combine technology ====
The Combine use an arsenal of science fiction technologies. They have access to teleportation technology, which transports them between dimensions. However, their teleporter technology is restrictive in comparison to that developed by Eli Vance, Isaac Kleiner and Judith Mossman in that it cannot be used to teleport to other locations within the same dimension. Throughout the games, various futuristic computer consoles, doors, power sources and weapon emplacements are encountered. In addition, the Combine employ the use of robotic drones called city scanners, to observe the citizens of Earth. They monitor individuals and take photographs, while combat drones called shield scanners are used to drop mines. Civil Protection makes use of smaller drones called manhacks, which are equipped with razor-sharp rotating blades to attack targets with laceration injuries. These are often deployed in closed-in areas. The Combine also use two types of land mines; hopper mines throw themselves into the air and detonate when an enemy is detected nearby, while spherical rollermines roll towards vehicles or enemies, attach themselves and deliver electrical attacks. Combine technology is also used to transform humans into Overwatch soldiers or Stalkers, deformed and mutilated humans with no memory of their past selves who act as slaves and maintenance workers in Combine facilities. Transformation into a Stalker is considered among the Combine's worst punishments for dissidents.

Militarily, the Combine make use of both synthetics, creatures augmented with machinery, and traditional machines such as armored personnel carriers and attack helicopters. The most prominent of the synthetic machines are the insect-like gunships; and Striders, 50-foot-tall (15 m) armored creatures which walk on three legs and are armed with a high powered cannon and a head-mounted pulse turret. In Episode Two, the Hunter, a smaller equivalent to the Strider, is introduced. These tripodal assault machines fire explosive flechettes at targets and are small enough to maneuver indoors. Other synths are seen near the end of the Half-Life 2, though their roles are not elaborated on. Sentry turrets are also used by the Combine. The Combine often uses headcrabs as a method of bioterrorism against dissidents and refugees, firing artillery shells loaded with the creatures into areas and allowing them to infest said area.

== Appearances ==
According to the backstory presented during Half-Life 2, the Combine appear on Earth after the death of the Nihilanth (the boss character at the end of Half-Life, who was killed by Gordon Freeman in an attempt to stop the "resonance cascade"). The death of the Nihilanth, a powerful creature controlling the dimensional rip between Xen and the Black Mesa Research Facility on Earth, causes the rip to worsen, resulting in "portal storms" which spread the hostile wildlife of Xen across Earth. The Combine manipulate this tear in the spacetime continuum, widening it to allow access to Earth from their dimension. When sufficiently wide enough, the Combine launched an invasion in force. Earth is rapidly defeated in a war lasting seven hours (the title is a reference to the Soviet military exercise Щит-82; "Seven-Hour Nuclear War"). Earth's surrender was negotiated by Dr. Wallace Breen, administrator of the Black Mesa Research Facility at the time of the incident, who discovered a means of communicating with the Combine. Dr. Breen was subsequently made the Combine's puppet ruler of Earth, with City 17 as his base of operations. Following their conquering of Earth the Combine installed a totalitarian state, introduced a reproductive suppression field intended to stop human reproduction, and exploited the Earth's population as well as its natural and human-made resources for its own benefit.

The Combine's first appearance is in Half-Life 2. Through the early stages of the game, Combine Civil Protection units pursue Gordon Freeman, the player character, through City 17 after Gordon's presence is mistakenly revealed to Dr. Breen. Due to Gordon's actions in Half-Life and his subsequent disappearance, which earned him a legendary reputation, Dr. Breen sees Gordon as a significant threat. As Gordon flees the city, Civil Protection units raid the resistance base of Black Mesa East and capture resistance leader Eli Vance, who is transferred to holding facilities at Nova Prospekt. Gordon, along with Eli's daughter Alyx, breaks into the facility to rescue him, but Eli is teleported to the Combine Citadel by double agent Judith Mossman. The strike against Nova Prospekt prompts a revolution by the citizens of Earth and heavy street fighting takes place.

In Episode One, the destruction of the teleporter has isolated Combine forces on Earth, and its primary reactor has begun to melt down. This forces Gordon and Alyx to journey back into the critically damaged Citadel to stabilize its reactor while the city's inhabitants are evacuated. The Combine forces, however, instead attempt to accelerate the meltdown in order to contact their native dimension for reinforcements. After Alyx acquires an encrypted copy of the message to be sent, Overwatch forces desperately attempt to stop the pair from escaping the city, spurred on by Combine Advisors. As the pair escape on a train at the end of the game, the Citadel detonates and destroys City 17.

Episode Two opens with Alyx and Gordon learning a superportal to the Combine dimension has formed in the Citadel's place, progressing to a stage where the Combine can send reinforcements. They also discover that Alyx's encrypted data from the Citadel can reverse the portal, and so traverse the countryside to deliver the packet to another resistance headquarters at White Forest. As they progress, Combine Advisors have escaped the Citadel's destruction, and remaining Combine forces are regrouping, albeit under attacks by Vortigaunts. Aware of the resistance's plans to close the superportal, the Combine attack White Forest in force, but are repelled.

The Combine are again the primary antagonist in the prequel Half-Life: Alyx, taking place between Half-Life and Half-Life 2. The game focuses on the efforts of Alyx Vance, her father Eli, and fellow resistance member Russell, as they attempt to infiltrate a massive Combine vault, believing it possesses a weapon that they could use to weaken the Combine occupation on Earth. After navigating through various quarantine zones of City 17 and rescuing Eli, they discover that the Vault is constructed not to hold a weapon, but as a prison, which they deduce to be holding Gordon Freeman. Alyx infiltrates the Vault and learns that it does not imprison Freeman, but is instead harboring the mysterious G-Man, who shows Alyx a glimpse of Eli's death in the future and offers her a chance to prevent it, which she accepts, before placing her in stasis. (Note: As depicted in the events of Half-Life 2: Episode 2)

The related Portal series hints at the presence of the Combine, with malevolent AI GLaDOS claiming that she is the only thing standing between Chell and "them".

== Promotion and reception ==
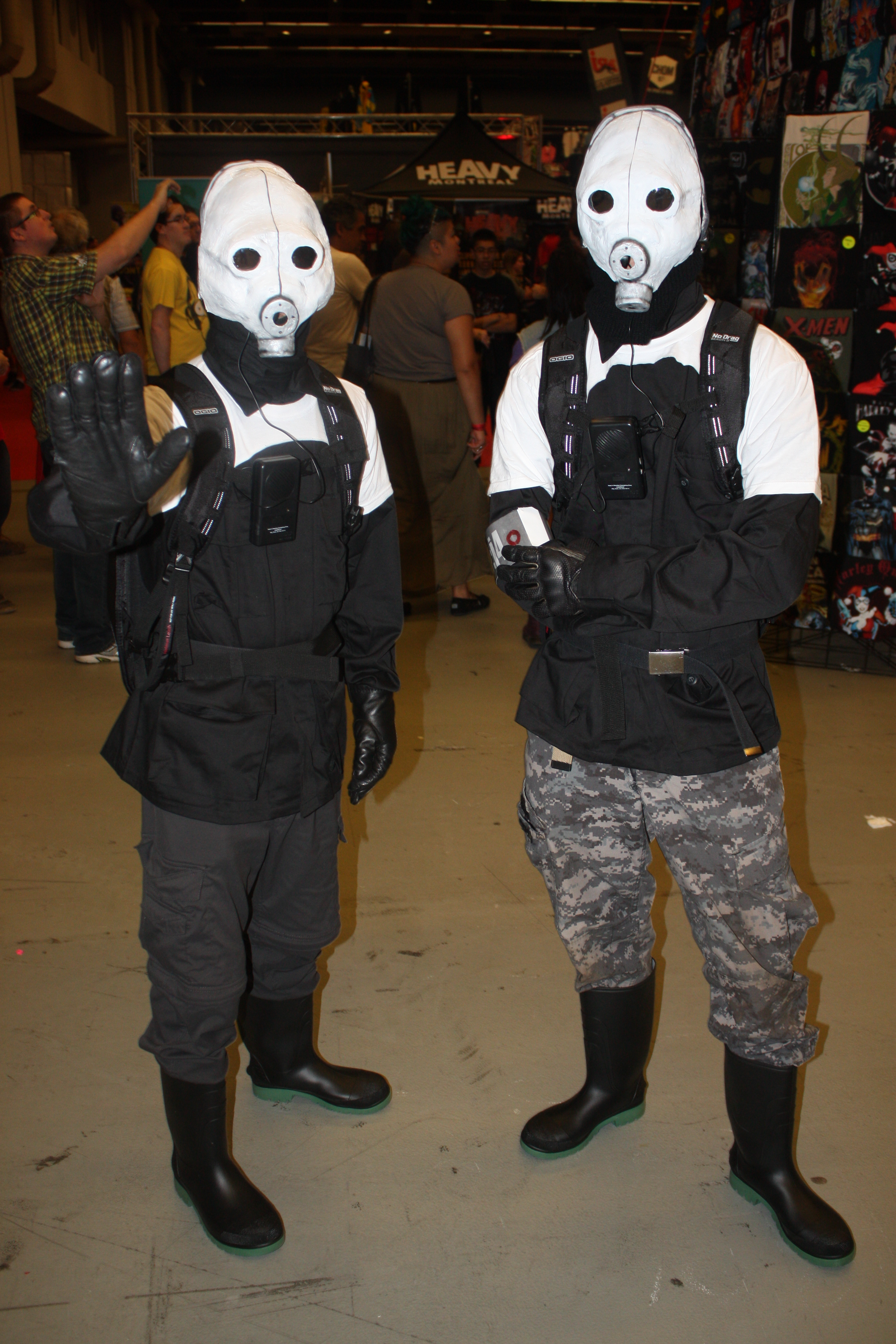
Cosplayers dressed as "metrocops" at Montreal Comiccon 2015

The Combine have inspired the creation of several items of merchandise for the Half-Life series. A plush toy was created by Valve, based on the synthetic tripod Hunters introduced in Episode Two. Sold and distributed via Valve's online store, the toy was released in February 2008. In addition, Valve has produced t-shirts depicting the Combine's idea of humanity's evolution, from ape to Combine Overwatch soldier mirroring The March of Progress, and a lithograph displaying twelve pieces of concept art for the Combine soldier.

The Combine have received a positive reaction from critics. 1UP.com praised the "epic feel" built up by the Combine and their harsh rule of City 17 in Half-Life 2, stating that this created "a world governed by newspeak, decorated with urban decay, and lacking any hope". GameSpot echoed this praise, saying that the "vision of a dystopian police state is chillingly effective". PC Zone described the appearance of the Combine's soldiers as "Stormtrooper-like". While stating that overall the artificial intelligence for the game was "extremely competent", they expressed the opinion that Combine non-player characters "could have used better survival instincts", citing their reluctance to take cover and tendency to charge at the player and into a shotgun blast. GameSpot noted that their AI had been slightly improved in Episode One. The addition of the Hunter in Episode Two was praised by critics; Computer and Video Games stated that they were challenging to fight and were "a very welcome addition" to the series, while IGN stated that the Hunters were "impressively designed", "sleek and powerful all at once", and "reek of malicious alien intelligence".

In Playing Dystopia, the Combine are directly compared with the Party in George Orwell's Nineteen Eighty-Four as a totalitarian regime organized according to an ideology. The book notes that Dr. Breen represents an archetypal father figure who lies that the Combine have created a utopia in order to justify the invasion. His reference to the Combine as "our Benefactors" ties back to the novel We by Yevgeny Zamyatin, in which the term is used to describe the ruler of the One State. The Combine also create the image of a utopia through mind manipulation and propaganda, causing humanity to accept a false sense of safety and "womb-like security". The suppression field deployed by the Combine to prevent new births and destroy the concept of the family was also compared to P. D. James' The Children of Men. Videogames and Education calls it a "terrible irony" that, having eliminated children, they positioned themselves as humanity's protector and nurturer. Aliens in Popular Culture describes the Combine's uniforms and architecture as referencing communism and fascism, comparing its overtones to Starship Troopers. The Brain Bugs from that novel are specifically noted as being referenced by the appearance and abilities of the Combine Advisors.

=== Fan works ===
The use of sandbox applications like Garry's Mod have allowed for Combine non-player characters to be used in a variety of webcomics and machinima productions. In one webcomic, Concerned, the Combine are portrayed as a highly bureaucratic and often inept organization. One issue shows a Civil Protection briefing for attempting to capture the comic's protagonist Gordon Frohman, in which officers are instructed to cluster around explosive barrels, seek cover on unstable structures and rappel down from bridges in front of fast moving vehicles. In another example, the machinima series Combine Nation follows Civil Protection officers in a similar style to police procedural documentaries. Other media portray the Combine with more serious overtones, such as the live-action video The Combine Interview, which parodies an interview with Tom Cruise discussing Scientology. The video, described by both Joystiq and Kotaku as "creepy", instead presents an interview with a Civil Protection officer discussing the Combine's rule of Earth, adapting Cruise's words to fit the Combine theme. PC Gamer UK noted that "the suggestion, of course, is that Scientology's purpose or self-image in some way resembles that of the homogenizing intergalactic murderous alien collective".
