= Gordon Freeman =

Half-Life protagonist

- Half-Life character
- Gordon in Half-Life 2 (2004)
- First game: Half-Life (1998)
- Created by: Gabe Newell
- Designed by: Gabe Newell; Marc Laidlaw

In-universe information
- Home: Seattle, Washington
- Nationality: American

Gordon Freeman is the silent protagonist of the Half-Life video game series, created by Gabe Newell and designed by Marc Laidlaw of Valve. His first appearance is in Half-Life (1998). Gordon is depicted as a bespectacled white man from Seattle, with brown hair and a signature circle beard, who graduated from MIT with a PhD in theoretical physics. He was an employee at the fictional Black Mesa Research Facility. Controlled by the player, Gordon is often tasked with using a wide range of weapons and tools to fight alien creatures such as headcrabs, as well as Combine machines and soldiers. Gordon's character has been well received by critics and gamers, and various gaming websites often consider him to be one of the greatest video game characters of all time, including UGO and GameSpot.

== Character design ==
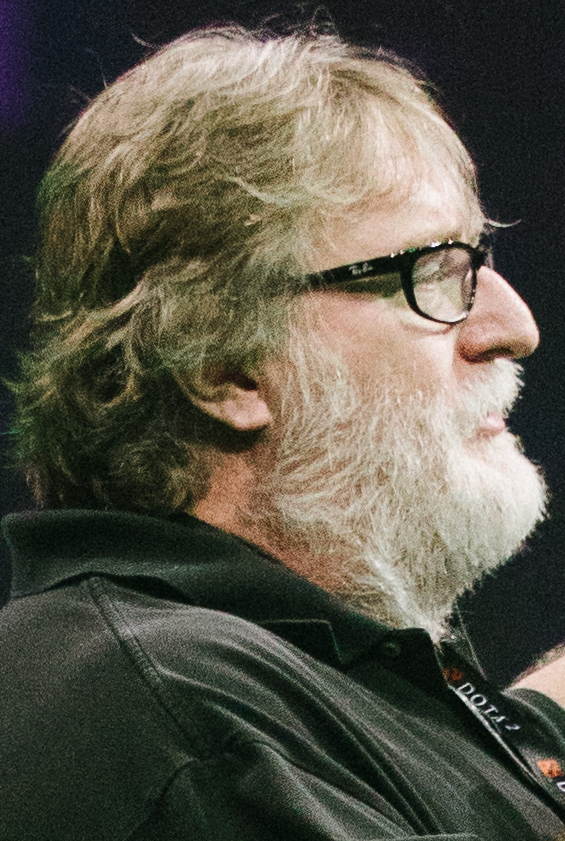
An early concept art of Gordon Freeman, wearing a bulkier HEV suit, helmet, and goggles (left) and his creator Gabe Newell (right, pictured in 2018)

Valve president and Half-Life director Gabe Newell coined the name "Gordon Freeman" during a conversation with the game's writer Marc Laidlaw in his car. Laidlaw had originally named the character "Dyson Poincaré", combining the names of physicist and philosopher Freeman Dyson and mathematician Henri Poincaré. The texture for Gordon's head was "too big of a job for just one person", so Valve designers combined references from four people. An earlier model of Gordon, known as "Ivan the Space Biker", had a full beard that was subsequently trimmed. Other iterations of Gordon's concept featured different glasses, a ponytail, and a helmet.

Gordon wears a special full-body hazmat suit, known as the Hazardous Environment Suit (or HEV Suit). The suit is designed to protect the user from radiation, energy discharges, and blunt trauma during the handling of hazardous materials. The suit's main feature is its "high-impact reactive armor", an electrically powered armor system that, when charged, absorbs two-thirds of the damage that Gordon would ordinarily suffer in Half-Life and 80% in Half-Life 2. A fully charged suit can survive several dozen hits from small arms and even one direct hit from an RPG. The suit can be charged by various means, and has its own oxygen supply and medical injectors, such as morphine and a neurotoxin antidote. It comes with a built-in flashlight, a radio (which frequently picks up enemy communications), various tracking devices, a compass, and a Geiger counter. The suit contains an on-board computer system that constantly monitors the user's health and vital signs, and reacts to any changes in the user's condition. It also projects a heads-up display (HUD) which displays Gordon's health and suit charge level, remaining ammunition, and a crosshair. As a means of immersing the player in the role, Gordon never speaks, and there are no cutscenes or mission briefings—all action is viewed through Gordon's eyes, with the player retaining control of Gordon's actions at nearly all times. Gordon does not appear to wear the helmet, although other dead scientists that appear throughout the game have one. The images of Gordon are only seen on the game's cover and menu pages, and also in advertisements, making them marketing tools rather than pictures of what Gordon is "really like". Gabe Newell has stated that Valve sees no reason to give Gordon a voice.

In Half-Life, Gordon wears the Mark IV suit. Later in the game, the suit is equipped with an optional long-jump module so Gordon can leap great distances. It is charged using power modules throughout Black Mesa. In Half-Life 2 Gordon receives the upgraded Mark V suit, which lacks the long-jump module but gains several new abilities. It features a visual zooming capability, limited sprinting, an anti-venom injector, an optional ammo and a health counter on the crosshair, and has been modified to use Combine power nodes to charge the suit.

The Mark V initially used a single power source for the flashlight, sprinting, and oxygen supply; in Half-Life 2: Episode Two the flashlight was given a separate power source to improve gameplay. The symbol on Gordon's HEV suit is the lowercase Greek letter Lambda, λ. This symbol is used by scientists to denote the decay constant of radioactive elements (related to the half-life of an element). As well as appearing on Gordon's suit, the symbol replaces the letter "a" in the game title (Hλlf-Life) and is the name of the complex in the Black Mesa Research Facility where teleportation experiments are conducted in the first game. The Lambda symbol is also seen in Half-Life 2 as a marking of the human resistance, seen close to hidden supplies and on the armbands of better equipped resistance fighters.

== Appearances ==
Half-Life opens on Gordon Freeman as a research assistant at the Anomalous Materials wing of the Black Mesa Research Facility. After donning the Hazardous Environment suit for an experiment, Freeman survives an interdimensional "resonance cascade", taking up a crowbar as his signature weapon and fighting his way across the facility against both extradimensional invaders and hostile US marines to seal the rift. In Half-Life 2, after being kept in stasis for nearly two decades, Freeman battles the Combine Empire to liberate Earth. He gains legendary status as part of the resistance against the Combine forces and sparks a rebellion, ultimately destroying the Citadel, a major Combine stronghold. The G-Man rescues Freeman after this critical event, praising his accomplishments and placing him back in stasis.

In Episode One, Gordon Freeman and Alyx Vance work to stabilize the Citadel's core to prevent a catastrophic explosion. In Episode Two, they work together to transport crucial data to close a forming super portal. After a revelation from the G-Man about saving Alyx, they learn about the Borealis, a research vessel with the potential to cause significant events. The game ends with Alyx mourning her father's death at the hands of a Combine Advisor.

Half-Life: Alyx, set five years before Half-Life 2, follows Alyx Vance trying to locate Gordon. She infiltrates a Combine vault, believing it holds Gordon, but instead releases the G-Man. As a reward for freeing him, the G-Man shows her a vision of her father's death in the future, and offers her the chance to change the outcome. Alyx complies, killing the Advisor and saving her father, and the G-man suspends her in stasis and leaves. Five years later, Freeman regains consciousness at White Forest and is reunited with Eli. Realizing that the G-Man has Alyx, Eli declares his intention to kill him and hands Freeman his crowbar.

== Critical reception ==
Gordon Freeman quickly became and then remained one of the most popular video game characters ever. In 2008, The Age ranked him as the 16th-best Xbox character of all time, adding that "no one has done more for the reputations and street cred of theoretical physicists than Valve." In 2009, GameDaily listed the "strong and silent type" in their top 25 video game archetypes, using Gordon Freeman as an example. In 2010, Empire ranked him as the number one Greatest Video Game Character, commenting that "the character is the quintessential geek fantasy" who "has become a gaming icon, synonymous with the apotheosis of first-person action."

He was also ranked 14th on UGO.com's list of top 100 heroes in all media, with a comment that "an MIT graduate, donning black-framed glasses and a goatee, he's not the guy you'd picture decimating the alien threat." In 2012, GamesRadar ranked him as the sixth "most memorable, influential, and badass" protagonist in games, adding: "It's how the characters of the Half-Life universe treat Gordon Freeman, not the way he treats them, that shape such a compelling character." In 2013, Complex ranked him as the 45th "most badass" video game character of all time.

In 1998, readers of GameSpot ranked him as the fifth-best Hero of gaming. In 2009, a public poll on GameSpot resulted in him being voted the All Time Greatest Video Game Hero. He was also voted as the eighth-best video game character of all time in the Guinness World Records Gamer's Edition 2011.
