= List of GoldSrc mods =

List of mods for Valve's first game engine

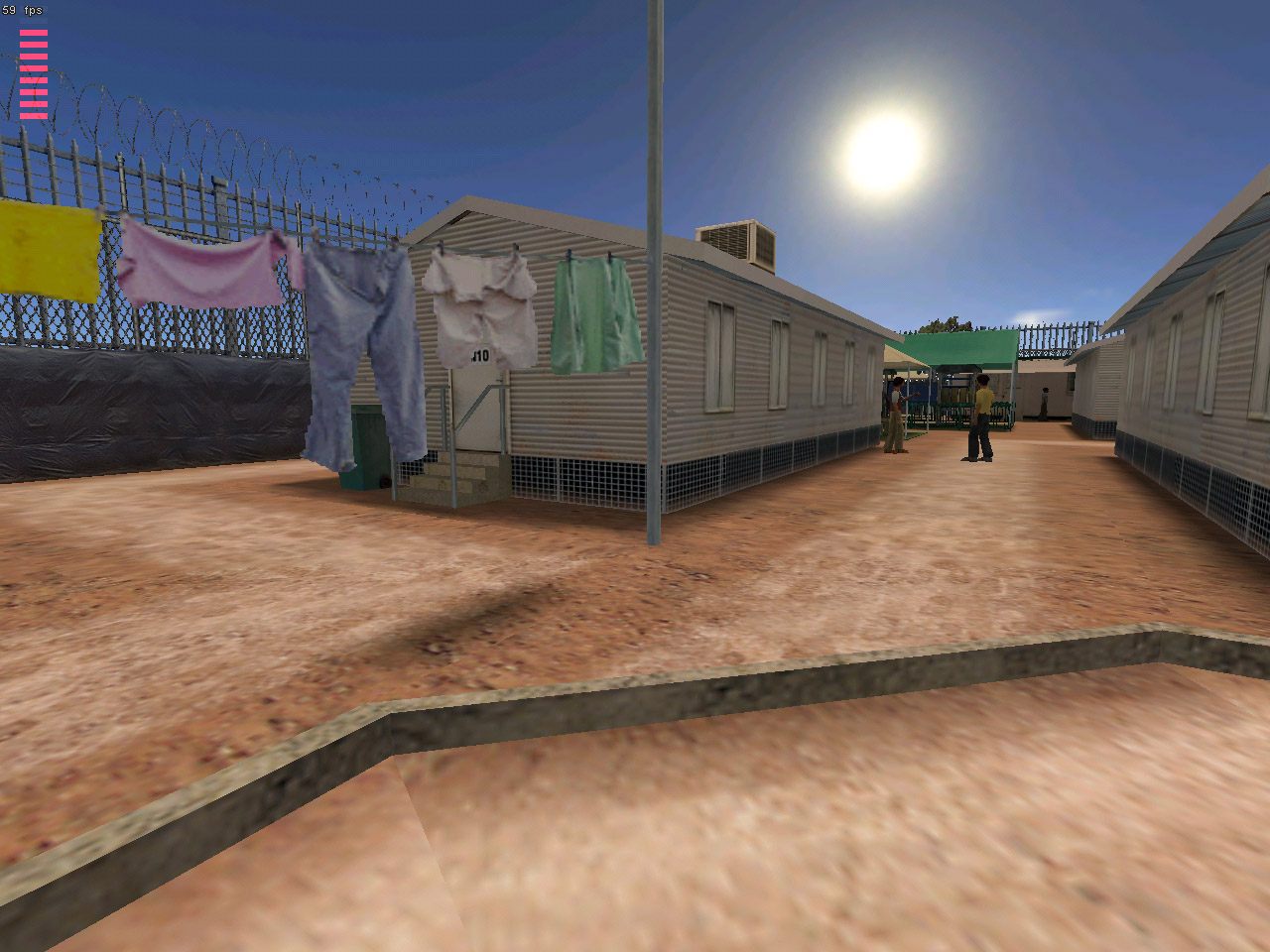
Escape from Woomera is a point-and-click adventure game set in the Woomera Immigration Reception and Processing Centre.

This is a list of GoldSrc mods (modifications) for the video game Half-Life (HL).

== Single-player mods ==
- Afraid of Monsters - A mod released in 2005 centered around David Leatherhoff, a drug addict who, after admitting himself to a hospital for help following intense hallucinations, finds the hospital and city to be full of monsters that he must fend off.A refurbished Director's Cut version of the mod was released in 2007. PC Zone called the mod "unnerving". Computer Games Magazine said it's "one of the most striking mods out there for survival-horror fans." Giochi per il mio computer gave it a rating of three out of five.
- Azure Sheep - A mod released in 2001 where the player controls Barney searching Black Mesa for his colleague Kate, codenamed Azure Sheep. After rescuing her, Kate functions as an AI companion for the rest of the mission. The mod was said to be similar to Half-Life: Blue Shift. It received positive reviews from PC Zone, Incite PC Games, 3DActionPlanet, and Planet Half-Life. In 2019, a first part of a remake for Black Mesa was released.
- Chemical Existence – The player is Reese Max who must navigate a city in a warzone with mutant creatures, gang members, and the military forces.
- Cry of Fear – The spiritual successor of Afraid of Monsters, it puts the player in the shoes of Simon, who must make his way back home through the city of Stockholm while facing various nightmarish monsters along the way. It features a co-op mode. Though initially a mod, it was later released as a free standalone game on 25 April 2013, via Steam.
- Escape from Woomera – An unfinished point-and-click adventure game, intended to critique the treatment of mandatorily detained asylum seekers in Australia as well as the Australian government's attempt to impose a media blackout on the detention centers.
- Half-Life: Echoes – Having a greater emphasis on survival horror than the base game, the player controls an unnamed scientist at the Black Mesa Research Facility surviving the Resonance Cascade and invasion by Xen and HECU forces.
- Point of View – A mod released on May 2, 2003 by the developers of Azure Sheep. The player character is a vortigaunt named Xonxt. The player can only use alien weaponry and has no armor. Medkits can't be used, instead Xen healing pools have to be used for restoring health. The Games Machine gave the mod a positive review. PC Zone gave the mod a rating of 76 out of 100 and called it "a refreshing alternative".
- Poke646 – Released in December 2001. Takes place after the events of Half-Life in Nation City. Features new weapons and textures. Named often one of the best single-player mods for Half-Life.
- Poke646: Vendetta – Released in December 2006. Sequel to Poke646. Received a positive review by PC Action.
- They Hunger – This is a single-player horror-based mod. It was released by Neil Manke's Black Widow Games in three episodes, the first in 1999, the second in 2000, and the final installment in 2001. All three were at one point bundled with PC Gamer magazine.
- USS Darkstar – A mod by Neil Manke, produced by PC Gamer and released on July 14, 1999. This mod follows a scientist on a deep-space scientific mission aboard an interstellar spacecraft. When an experiment goes awry, the player has to defend himself against aliens. The mod was first released on the PC Gamer website and was featured on the magazine's demo CD in August 1999. The mod received positive reviews from PC Games and PC Action. Planet Half-Life called it "A true masterpiece".
- Wanted! – A Wild West-style mod which follows a town Sheriff and his hunt for a bandit. Enemies include rattlesnakes, Native Americans and other outlaws. It contains original voice acting and era-specific weapons, and was created by Maverick Developments and released as a free mod. For some time it was bundled with the retail version of Counter-Strike, along with another mod by Maverick Developments, Absolute Redemption which was a chapter set between Half-Life and Half-Life 2.

== Multiplayer mods ==
- Arg! – A pirate-themed deathmatch mod focused on melee combat. PC Zone gave a rating of two out of five. PC PowerPlay wrote: "All new weapons, maps and outstanding pirate features make this a must download."
- Action Half-Life – A team-based multiplayer mod developed as part of the popular series of "Action"-based mods, designed to emulate the feel of an action movie. Members of the development team had previously worked with developers of Counter-Strike on the mod Action Quake 2.
- Battle of the Millenium – A superhero-themed class-based deathmatch mod. Six characters are included: Batman, Mega Man, Son Goku, Spawn, Spider-Man, and Superman. In addition of standard weapons, each character has four special powers. Gen4 called the graphics convincing but said the mod is unbalanced since the characters are not equal in power.
- Blood for Honor – A medieval fantasy deathmatch mod. It includes nine different classes to choose from. .NetGamer called it an interesting mod with an RPG touch.
- Canned Tuna – Deathmatch mod with five game modes. One of them is called "Gib The Llama" where players are turned into llamas after every odd-numbered respawn. In every game mode players have five weapons with unlimited ammunition (except trip mines). It received a score of three out of five from PC Zone, calling it a weird but incohesive gaming experience. The mod was said to be unpopular with few servers running it.
- Cold Ice – Features fast-paced gameplay (aided by tools like a jetpack and a grappling hook) and revamps all of the weapons and the color scheme to icy blue.
- Counter-Strike – A team-based tactical first-person shooter game involving rounds of combat between two teams, counter-terrorists and terrorists. Counter-Strike was later released commercially by Valve as a standalone game.
- Day of Defeat – A World War II first-person shooter, originally a mod and later a commercially released game.
- Deathmatch Classic – An official mod by Valve that updates the multiplayer gameplay from id Software's Quake, featuring enhanced textures, models, and lighting. It was released on June 7, 2001, and included in an update to Half-Life a month later. OS X and Linux ports of the Windows game were released through Steam in August 2013.
- Deathmatch Plus – A mod split off from Oz Deathmatch. The mod has a "Lights Out" mode that turns off all the bright lights in a map. Also includes night vision goggles, a silenced machine gun and hand grenades can be exchanged for cluster bombs. CNET Gamecenter placed it on its list of top 10 Half-Life mods, comparing it to Oz Deathmatch, saying that the mod is easier to use and the grappling hook is better but the night vision mode is worse.
- Earth's Special Forces – Third-person fighting oriented game based on the anime Dragon Ball Z. In development since at least 2000, when early alpha versions were released, the mod features fast-paced 3D melee combat, shooting energy attacks, flight mechanics, character transformations, and multiple game modes. Each playable character has unique abilities, along with distinct strengths and weaknesses.
- Firearms – A team deathmatch-based game where the emphasis is on weapons and player customization.
- Fist Full of Steel – Features a point system where the more points the player scores, the better weapons they have access to. Includes modes for deathmatch, team deathmatch, and objective-based teamplay.
- Front Line Force – A team oriented first person shooter mod in which players are divided into 2 teams: Attackers and Defenders.
- Gangsta Wars – Gangster-themed mod that features four game modes: deathmatch, gangbang, capture the stash, and protect the don. Features more urban-type guns than other military mods. The mod also features financial and experience systems.
- Jailbreak – Based on a classic Quake II mod of the same name. When the player is fragged, they are sent to the opposing team's jail. If all players from one team are jailed, the round ends and the winners receive a point. The prisoners can escape by waiting for a teammate to open the jail cell. Each map has another escape route (e.g. air vent) that requires multiple prisoners to reach. CNET Gamecenter placed it on its list of top 10 Half-Life mods, writing: "Jailbreak also creates a powerful bond between players on the same team; there's a tangible sense of gratitude when someone releases you from captivity and lets you back into the game." A new version of the mod, Open Source JailBreak, was released when the original mod stopped development.
- Kanonball – Australian-developed futuristic sports game described as a mix between lacrosse and rugby. There are three different athlete types and six player positions. The developers said they had to drop some features from the mod due to limitations of the Half-Life engine. PC Zone gave a rating of 71% for the LAN-only version and a rating of 72% for the online-compatible version, saying the online component is "very weak" and LAN is still the preferred way to play. PC Action called it a challenging and fun mod.
- Lambda Arena – A version of the Quake series mod Rocket Arena, released in 1999. It is mainly for one versus one matches but the mod supports teamplay up to four players. CNET Gamecenter placed it on its list of top 10 Half-Life mods, writing: "Lambda Arena has a great American Gladiators feel, with gaudy but functional arenas."
- Master Sword – A cooperative fantasy role-playing total conversion mod. During character creation, the player has the option to select a race, which can be either human, dwarf, or elf. The available classes include wizard, archer, and rogue. Incite PC Games gave the mod a score of seven out of ten. The mod received an expansion titled Master Sword: Continued. PC Action gave the expansion a "good" rating.
- Natural Selection – A mod in which two teams (humans and aliens) fight against each other. Its utilizes a mixture of first-person shooter and real-time strategy gameplay. It gained a standalone successor, Natural Selection 2.
- The Opera – Released on July 9, 2001. The gameplay features diving, rolling, and dual wielding that is described as "gun ballet". The game features minimal heads-up display (HUD) with no ammo, health or armour displayed. The mod was in production for two years. PC Zone gave a rating of three out of five.
- Opposing Force CTF – A capture the flag mod based on Gearbox Software's expansion pack Half-Life: Opposing Force that was originally released in Half-Life patch 1.1.0.0. A standalone version was released a few months later.
- Oz Deathmatch – An early serverside mod that is a collection of deathmatch configuration options. Options that can be changed include magazine size, amount of blood, and weapon recoil. The mod also adds a new gadget, a grappling hook. The mod also supports Team Fortress Classic maps. In January 2000, it was listed among the top five HL mods on GameSpy's server browser. CNET Gamecenter placed it on its list of top 10 Half-Life mods, writing: "Oz has long been one of our favorite ways to deathmatch."
- Ricochet – An official Half-Life mod by Valve. It was released on November 1, 2000, and included in Half-Life's version 1.1.1.0 update, released on June 12, 2002. Ports of the game to OS X and Linux were released through Steam on August 1, 2013.
- Rocket Crowbar – An early mod that modifies every weapon in the game. For example the crowbar shoots "drunk" rockets and RPG shoots scientist and Barney modelled proximity mines. The mod also includes a capture the flag mode. Rocket Crowbar Redux: Source, was released for the Source engine. It includes weapons like gravity grenade and a scientist shotgun.
- Runaway Train – Similar to the game king of the hill, one player is on a train, the other players try to knock them off of it. The longer the player stays on the train, the more points they score. Gen4 gave a positive review. PC Powerplay and Computer Games noted it as a classic mod. A remake mod, Train Hunters, was released after the development of Runaway Train went inactive.
- Russian Front – A World War II-themed mod set on the Eastern Front, released in 2000 by Borderline Studios. It's a class-based mod with two teams: Germans and Russians.
- Sabaneta 2050 – Takes place in the year 2050. The teams are cops and convicts where the match can be won by either taking out the other team or just their leader. There is another game mode where only the convicts have a leader. Players gain experience points by killing opponents and lose them by dying or killing teammates.
- Science and Industry – A team-based multiplayer mod in which players take the roles of security guards at two competing research firms. It features a weapons research system.
- Scientist Hunt – Red and blue teams try to kill more scientists than the other team. The mod includes bots and an option to fight human or bot opponents. PC Zone gave a rating of four out of five.
- The Ship – Set on a 1920s recreational cruise ship. Each player is assigned a quarry, and the object is to murder him or her with nobody watching, while at the same time watching out for, and defending themselves against their own hunter. Later released as a standalone game on the Source engine.
- The Specialists – This multiplayer mod is intended to resemble a stylized action movies.
- Sven Co-op – Is a co-op mod in which players fight against computer-controlled enemies, it was released as a standalone game in 2016. Apart from user contributed missions it is also possible to play co-operatively through the original Half-Life game and its expansions, though the expansions can only be accessed if owned by everyone in the server.
- Team Fortress Classic – Originally a mod ported from Quakeworld that introduced a class-system style of play that allowed for many diverse playing styles. With the introduction of Steam it became a standalone game and as of October 10, 2007 it has a commercially released sequel Team Fortress 2.
- Trinity Command – Similar to Unreal Tournament's Domination game mode where two teams try to control various points on the map. GameStar said the included bots are useful but noted the maps as monotonous and classes unbalanced.
- Turbo – A racing game where players control snarks, beetle-like creatures from Half-Life. PC Zone gave it a rating two out of five, calling the mod great fun but noted the lack of players online and its tendency to crash.
- Underworld: Bloodline – an asymmetric multiplayer FPS based on the Underworld film franchise. Developed by Black Widow Games in 2003 as a promotional tie-in for the film Underworld, it is the only officially licensed Half-Life mod associated with a Hollywood movie. The mod was available on the Sony Pictures official website until the end of 2007. Players choose between Vampires and Lycans, engaging in objective-based combat across urban maps. Each faction has distinct classes, weapons, and movement abilities. The gameplay involves capturing or defending Hybrid NPCs across four maps, incorporating mechanics inspired by Counter-Strike and Vampire Slayer.
- Vampire Slayer – is a teamplay mod where two sides: vampires and slayers, battle it out in a variety of atmospheric settings. Planet Half-Life called the original release "A great mod". They also reviewed Chapter IV and wrote: "The new maps fit perfectly with the atmosphere built up from the previous releases." PC Zone gave version 1.1 a rating of three out of five, Chapter III a rating of 69%, and Chapter V a rating of 91%.
- War in Europe – A World War II-themed mod released in 1999 that includes deathmatch, team deathmatch, and capture the flag. The player earns "promotions" by fragging, which allows purchasing of additional weapons. If the player takes a hit, they will start to bleed, which can be treated with a medkit. PC Gameplay reviewed the game in 2001 and gave a rating of six out of ten, calling it worse than Day of Defeat.
- Wasteland Half-Life – A post-apocalyptic-themed mod with modes for deathmatch, team deathmatch, and objective capture. PC Zone gave it a score of four out of five and said it's not as popular as it deserves to be. .NetGamer said that despite the familiar gameplay, the mod has a top-notch technical execution. They also praised the maps and the character models. Later, an updated version of the mod was released, titled The Wastes. PC Zone gave it a score 69 out of 100 and called it a worthwhile update.
- Wizard Wars – A fantasy-themed mod where the players are wizards who use wands to shoot spells at each other. There are six wizard classes. Game modes are capture the grail (capture the flag variant) and deathmatch. PC Gameplay gave the mod a score of seven out of ten, calling the mod: "Great fun overall, but let down slightly by poor graphics and slightly unbalanced spells. ".

== See also ==
- List of Source engine mods
- List of video games derived from mods
- Die Hard: Nakatomi Plaza, a video game developed as a Half-Life mod at one point
