= Poke646 =

2001 video game

- Developer: Poke646 team
- Designer: Marc Schröder
- Series: Half-Life
- Engine: GoldSrc
- Platform: Windows
- Release: 21 December 2001
- Genre: First-person shooter
- Mode: Single-player

Poke646 is a single-player mod for the computer game Half-Life. Set in an east German city, it concerns an alien outbreak. The mod features new weapons and enemies, and has many similarities with Half-Life 2. The lead designer, Marc Schröder, developed the game for his university diploma. It has been often called one of the best single-player mods for Half-Life.

A sequel, Poke646: Vendetta, was released in 2006. Anniversary Edition was released on 21 December 2016, the 15th anniversary of the original game. It bundles both Poke646 games and updates them to current versions of Steam and Half-Life.

== Plot ==
The game takes place 13 months after the story of Half-Life in Nation City. The player character is Damian Reeves, a technical assistant to Dr. Fuller at Poke646, an organization set up to investigate alien-related issues after the Black Mesa incident. Poke646 discovered an alien plan to invade the city. They intend to counter it by building four beam generators, which when activated close all Xen portals in the city. Reeves is knocked unconscious in a storeroom accident and when waking up, he discovers that the city has been evacuated due to an alien invasion. The player's objective is to activate the generators and defeat the aliens.

== Gameplay ==
The player wielding one of the nail guns, a new weapon created for the mod

The game features eight new weapons including a steel pipe, two different kinds of nail guns, a double-barreled shotgun, pipe bombs, and an alien gun that shoots acid. There is a stamina system when using the pipe, the character swings slower and with less power if it is used for too long. There is also a device called the IUIC which is used to contact the people at Poke646. The game features two new alien creatures: Explotoad and the final boss enemy.

== Critical reception ==
Reception

Review scores
Publication	Score
GameStar	84%
PC PowerPlay	5/5
PC Zone	65%

PC PowerPlay summarized: "Poke 646 is a fantastic HL mod that does justice to the feel of the original game and improves on it in several respects, while never giving players an unwanted sense of de ja vu." Level praised the graphics and music, and noted the weapon arsenal as original. It was called one of the best single-player Half-Life mods. The Games Machine said the graphics have been done excellently. Many of the puzzles were described as well-done and easy to solve but some were noted as frustrating and resulting in the player getting stuck for long periods. The combat was said to be the least impressive aspect of the game due to slow and predictable enemy artificial intelligence (AI). PC Zone also remarked the puzzles as frustrating but said the mod overall "is really pretty good and well worth sticking at." Computer Gaming World named Poke646 the single-player mod of the year, saying it is commercial quality in every way. They also called the puzzles clever and the high-resolution textures beautiful. One Planet Half-Life reviewer called it the best single-player mod ever. Another reviewer called it an "excellent mod" that is on par with Neil Manke's mods and professionally produced Half-Life missions. Another reviewer wrote: "Everything has been brilliantly done from the storyline to the new weapons down to the lowly little roaches. I have yet to find a single player mod that has been able to top Poke646’s magnificence." The report Modding Scenes said the mod has "utterly professional production values" and textures of "exceptional quality".

Poke646 was named as one of the best single-player mods by Mod DB in 2002 and 2003.

== Poke646: Vendetta ==
A sequel to named Poke646: Vendetta was released on 21 December 2006, the fifth anniversary of the original game. Due to its shorter length, it has been called an expansion pack. Vendetta features a new gun, the PAR-21 assault rifle.

Poke646: Vendetta's story continues on from the end of the first game and the player reprises the role of Damien Reeves. Damien Reeves plans to seek revenge for being betrayed by the Poke646 team and to stop the Poke646 scientists from destroying Nation City to stop the Xen invasion. The player fights his way through parts of the city again to reach the Poke646 headquarters and then the Alpha labs where Dr. Fuller and other staff are planning the nuclear clear out of Nation City. The player finds out that detonation charges have been placed in the conference room, and has to find the detonator. After battling with a large Robot, the player finds the detonator and detonates the conference room, killing everyone inside, including Dr. Fuller. A cut scene reveals Damien reading a letter from a vice-president of Poke646, saying he has been promoted for his actions and someone from administration will be there soon. A door opens revealing a man in a suit with a briefcase (his face is not seen), he simply says: "Quite a nasty piece of work, you managed over there. I am impressed." His voice reveals the identity of the G-Man from the Half-Life series.

PC Action gave a rating of "outstanding" and praised the mod's level design, graphics, and soundtrack. Planet Half-Life gave a positive review, they liked the graphics, and the soundtrack including music, ambient sounds, and sound effects.
