= Half-Life: Echoes =

Half-Life mod

- Title screen
- Developer: James "MrGnang" Coburn
- Series: Half-Life
- Engine: GoldSrc
- Platform: Windows
- Release: August 10, 2018
- Genre: First-person shooter
- Mode: Single-player

Half-Life: Echoes is a modification of the first-person shooter video game Half-Life created by British developer James "MrGnang" Coburn and released on August 10, 2018. The mod was under development for four years and uses the GoldSrc engine.

Echoes is from the perspective of an unnamed scientist from the Black Mesa Research Facility as the resonance cascade happens and has the player fight unused monsters and the HECU with the G-Man and "Kingpin" observing the player.

== Gameplay ==
As a mod for Half-Life, Half-Life: Echoes is a first-person shooter that differs slightly from the base game. The first part of the game is mainly survival horror, limiting the player's arsenal and introducing monsters, including unused enemies. The second half of the game has the player fight against the HECU Marines.

== Synopsis ==
Echoes restructures the Black Mesa Research Facility using the GoldSrc engine, and includes more dynamic lighting than the base Half-Life game.

=== Setting ===
Echoes is set in the same location and time frame as that of Half-Life, taking place at a remote New Mexico laboratory called the Black Mesa Research Facility, showing the events of Half-Life from the perspective of a different protagonist. The player assumes the role of an unnamed character, referred to as "Candidate Twelve," a scientist.

=== Plot ===
An unnamed character, only referred as "Candidate Twelve," arrives for work at the Black Mesa Research Facility. The facility has flickering of lights and failing electrical equipment, with tremors shaking it as scientists begin to worry about the experiment. After entering a tram, the "resonance cascade" forces Candidate Twelve to fight for survival as the G-Man observes. After the resonance cascade, Candidate Twelve battles through the facility's sewer system, encountering other survivors along the way. The gargantua, a massive alien organism, stalks the player's movements. The player eventually escapes to the surface in a large freight elevator. After taking it, Candidate Twelve meets a construction worker that has a plan to escape. He sends off Candidate Twelve to look for a security guard needed for a door he's stuck behind. At this time, military convoys can be seen entering Black Mesa. The player nearly escapes with the construction worker, a surviving security guard and scientist, but the construction worker turns out to be dead, impaled by crossbow arrows. The rest are ambushed by the HECU marines and killed. Candidate Twelve escapes and battles the military en route back to the transit hub from the start of the game. Along the way, Candidate Twelve encounters visions projected by a sentient entity that grants visions of the Universal Union, also known as the Combine. (Note: From Half-Life 2) The entity appears to be fleeing the powers of the enigmatic G-Man. Candidate Twelve arrives at a climactic confrontation between the Xen aliens and the HECU marines. After prevailing, the player is transported to the Black Mesa staff dormitories, where he is witness to the G-Man's rescue of Alyx Vance. The player is then abandoned by the G-Man and presumably killed by a nuclear explosion that was set off. (Note: As depicted in Half-Life: Opposing Force) Candidate Twelve's file is closed due to his influence from the mysterious entity from earlier in the game.

== Development ==
The mod was announced on March 6, 2014, by Coburn on Mod DB, citing the original Half-Life game and user-created mods as a reason to "give back to the community." Coburn stated that the mod was his "first real modding effort," creating a small campaign before expanding it during his spare time. The development took five years to complete before releasing on August 10. During the development, his child was born with a heart complication and required surgery at the Royal Hospital for Children, Glasgow and recovered. After the mod was complete, he requested all fans who wanted to donate to the hospital.

The mod uses voice lines from the original Half-Life, as well as Half-Life: Opposing Force, Half-Life: Blue Shift, Half-Life: Decay, and Half-Life 2: Episode Two.

On August 12, 2021, a team of developers announced a remake in Black Mesa called Black Mesa: Candidate Twelve after half a year in production. However this was confirmed to be on a hiatus in 2025 as they moved onto other projects.

== Critical reception ==
The mod was well received by critics and fans alike. Matthew Byrd of Den of Geek called the mod "something that Half-Life fans should consider playing." For the week of August 18, 2018, it was one of the biggest stories on Mod DB. Liana Ruppert of Comicbook.com said that Echoes had "the compelling storyline, the intrigue - Echoes has it all!" Rick Lane of Bit-Tech called it "a superb, expansion-quality mod, and a must-play for any Half-Life fan."

Half-Life: Echoes placed 3rd for the 2018 Mod of the Year Players' Choice and was an honorable mention for the 2019 Mod of the Year.
