= Chemical Existence =

2000 video game

- Developer: Red Genesis
- Engine: GoldSrc
- Platform: Windows
- Release: 14 October 2000
- Genre: First-person shooter
- Modes: Single-player, multiplayer

Chemical Existence is a single-player mod for the computer game Half-Life, developed by Sweden-based Red Genesis. It is primarily a single-player mod but includes a multiplayer deathmatch mode.

== Plot and gameplay ==
Stamina meter after health injection (bottom middle of the screen)

In the story, the player character Reese Max, tries to stop an evil corporation from taking over the world with mutants. The game takes place in the city of Motashe where Max is visiting his sister. The city has devolved into a warzone between mutated creatures, gang members, and the military.

All weapons have been newly created for the mod, which include standard and futuristic firearms. The game features a stamina system in which a meter fills when the player jumps and administers health injections. The player begins to incur damage once the meter reaches its capacity.

== Development ==
Chemical Existence was developed originally as a Quake II mod and it was in production for three years before eventually being released as a Half-Life mod. At the 1999 Half-Life Mod Expo, Chemical Existence was chosen as one of seven mods to be showcased at the event.

== Critical reception ==
PC Zone gave a rating of four out of five, calling the mod excellent and deeply involving. Konsolipelaaja said the graphics and sound are not top quality but the game is still captivating. Both PC Zone and Konsolipelaaja criticized the brightness of the levels as too dark. Level criticized the enemy AI and the excessive amount of scripted sequences which were said to result in the game feeling like an interactive film. The multiplayer maps were noted as decently made but the mode overall was said to be nowhere close to the quality of Counter-Strike or Half-Life's multiplayer mode. Xtreme PC called it a very good total conversion, better than some commercial products. GamesTM called it an atmospheric, slick, and satisfying shooter with a substantial campaign. Giga.de said the mod has a gripping story and is a must-have for all Half-Life owners. Planet Half-Life considered it "a single-player experience that's high quality and that feels gritty and gloomy".

== See also ==
- List of GoldSrc mods
