= Delta Particles =

- Developer(s): Yuri "XF-Alien" Epifantsev
- Series: Half-Life
- Engine: GoldSrc
- Release: October 29, 2021 (on Moddb); December 20, 2024 (on Steam)
- Genre(s): First-person shooter
- Mode(s): Single-player

Delta Particles, formerly known as Half-Life: Delta, is a game modification of Half-Life created by Russian developer Yuri "XF-Alien" Epifantsev, released on October 29, 2021. The mod was under development for twelve years, dating back to August 2009, and Epifantsev stated that Delta was their "largest and oldest project" and was "glad to finish the development." Delta Particles takes place at the Delta Base, where the protagonist, Nick Farrell, experiences the effects of the resonance cascade at the Black Mesa Research Facility and features four chapters and 35 maps.

== Gameplay and plot ==
Delta Particles is a total conversion mod, meaning that the game uses none or almost none of the resources used in the base game, though it takes place contemporaneously to the events of Half-Life. The game is set in the technical engineer complex Delta Base, an underground base in Nevada, a similar facility to the Black Mesa Research Facility, where generator engineer Nick Farrell works to maintain the generators. The Delta facility experiences the effects of the resonance cascade after an employee of Black Mesa, Gordon Freeman, inadvertently causes one at the main site in an experiment gone wrong. A guard named Otis helps Farrell try and escape the facility.

== Steam release ==
Epifantsev has released the modification on the video game digital distribution service Steam. However, the support team there asked him to not use Half-Life in the modification's title because it is trademarked. The modification was renamed Delta Particles in July 2023.
