= Science and Industry =

Mod for the video game Half-Life

- Engine: GoldSrc
- Platform: Windows
- Release: July 31, 1999
- Genre: First-person shooter
- Mode: Multiplayer

Science and Industry is a multiplayer, teamplay mod for the video game Half-Life. It is one of the oldest Half-Life mods and has been described as a classic mod. The current version of the game is 1.4 beta 14, released on January 19, 2019. The game was first publicly released on July 31, 1999, as version 0.94.

== Gameplay ==
Players assume the role of a security guard for one of two fictional corporations Amalgamated Fluorodynamics (AFD) and Midland Carbide Labs (MCL).

The main objective on the standard map type is to capture enemy scientists (who are non-player characters) while defending your own. This is accomplished by locating your enemies research labs, hitting one of the scientists there over the head with your briefcase and then taking him back to your company's administrator.

Additional scientists increase the rate of a company's income which can be considered the team's score.

Scientists also research new weapons, implants, armor upgrades and devices for their company. Each time a new technology is completed, players vote for the next one to be researched.

Players spawn in the "Cloning Facilities" of their company, where they can find weapons and ammo crates, as well as health and armor chargers. At the start of the game, the only weapons available are a briefcase and a pistol, but this arsenal grows bigger as new weapons are researched by the scientists. Players decide which technology to research next by voting for it. The available technologies are divided in 5 branches: Weapons, Armor, Implants, Devices and Process Upgrades.

Players decide to either defend their company or attack the other company. Attacking consists mainly of reaching the other company's laboratories, grabbing a scientist by knocking him out with the briefcase, and carrying back to the administrator. If a player dies while carrying a scientist, the scientist stays on the ground unconscious for a limited amount of time before teleporting back to his laboratories. During that time the original carrier or one of his teammates can pick up the scientist again. Some maps feature alternative objectives such as stealing resources (discs, biospecimen) or breaking computers. Defending requires protecting the company's laboratories, this is usually done by defending key areas (entries to the laboratories), killing intruders, and defending unconscious scientists.

=== Objectives ===
A standard game lasts 30 minutes. The company with the most money at the end wins.

The main way to earn money is to have more scientists than the enemy. Each company starts with three scientists, so a company is making more money than the enemy corporation if it employs at least 4 scientists. So the team with more scientists wins.

Some maps feature other objectives than capturing and protecting scientists. A first kind of alternative objective is breakables: these are computers or machinery that can be broken and cost money to replace. A second kind of alternative objective is resources: these are computer discs or research specimens that can be stolen and give a cash bonus.

Players also cost money to their company each time they die, since cloning them back to life is not free.

== Reception ==
Science and Industry has received praise for the quality of its maps and unique weapons, but with some criticism over patchy online play. Gen4 called it a very interesting mod with unique gameplay that required a time investment to grasp its nuances. PC Action gave the game a rating of "very good". CNET Gamecenter placed it on its list of top 10 Half-Life mods, calling it "a uniquely paced game with a rosy future."

== Sequel ==
Science and Industry 2 was released on July 3, 2008 for the Source engine. It received a 1.1 patch on July 31, 2008 and then the mod stopped development in November 2008.

== See also ==
- List of Half-Life mods
