= Half-Life VR but the AI Is Self-Aware =

2020 fan web series based on Half-Life

- Thumbnail for Acts 1 and 2. From left: Gordon Freeman, Dr. Coomer, Bubby, Tommy, and Benrey.
- Genre: Improv, role-playing, let's play
- Presented by: WayneRadioTV, Radio TV Solutions (Note: Streaming group consisting of WayneRadioTV and other HLVRAI cast members)
- Voices of: WayneRadioTV; Baaulp; Hollow_tones; MasterGir; Socpens; Spaghoner; Logmore; Lauren
- Ending theme: Aquacycle
- Composers: Aquacycle its3oe
- Original language: English
- No. of seasons: 2
- No. of episodes: 11

Original release
- Network: Twitch
- Release: March 5, 2020

Half-Life VR but the AI Is Self-Aware (abbreviated HLVRAI) is a 2020 improvisational machinima series based on the 1998 video game Half-Life, produced by YouTuber and livestreamer WayneRadioTV. The series follows a loose playthrough of the game, with the notable exception of certain non-player characters being controlled by improv actors, giving the impression of the player being directly aided or foiled by various self-aware AI characters. The series was live streamed to Twitch with highlights later uploaded to YouTube, and was filmed using several modifications for Garry's Mod to allow for a recreation of the Half-Life campaign in virtual reality and multiplayer.

Half-Life VR but the AI Is Self-Aware was met with generally positive reception by critics for its absurdist humor and unique recontextualization of the source material.

The series has spawned numerous spin-offs, including a sequel series set in Half-Life 2 that has been ongoing since March 2026.

== Plot ==
The series begins with a streamer (WayneRadioTV) (Note: The streamer is not WayneRadioTV himself but rather a fictionalized character played by WayneRadioTV.) playing a mod of Half-Life with VR support and intelligent AI characters. He begins a Let's Play, roleplaying as Gordon Freeman.

Freeman is walking through the Black Mesa Research Facility and encounters Benry (Note: Sometimes spelled Benrey.) (Socpens), an antagonistic security guard who demands he provide a passport for identification, and begins to follow and taunt him. Freeman also comes across three eccentric scientists: Tommy Coolatta (Baaulp), who is childlike and book smart, Dr. Harold Coomer (Hollow_tones), who is friendly and the subject of frequent glitches, and Dr. Bubby (MasterGir), who is cranky and acts rude towards Freeman.

Freeman and the scientists experiment on a crystal of unknown origin, which goes awry and triggers a resonance cascade. Freeman, the scientists, and Benry, collectively called "the science team", make their way through the damaged facility while fighting alien creatures and members of the US military, including an obstinate Marine named Forzen (Socpens). During the journey, Coomer accidentally noclips out of the map, causing him to suspect he may be in a video game. Freeman is betrayed by Bubby and Benry, leading him to be captured by the government soldiers deployed to clean up the incident. The soldiers cut off his arm and throw him into a trash compactor.

A delirious Freeman comes to and makes his way to an abandoned section of Black Mesa where he rejoins Tommy. He then encounters Coomer, who attempts to use Freeman as a way to escape the video game using several clones of himself. His plan fails and he rejoins Freeman's group. Freeman then finds Bubby stuck in his old test tube, who had also been betrayed by the military, along with Benry. Freeman reluctantly allows both of them to rejoin the group.

The science team proceed to Black Mesa's Mixology Department, headed by Darnold (Logmore), who gives Freeman a potion that causes his missing arm to regrow into a machine gun. The team fight their way to the Lambda Complex, where they teleport to Xen. In Xen, they find Benry has grown into a giant and begins floating around the others, taunting them. Benry is revealed to be the source of the resonance cascade, transforming into a monstrous alien form and attacking the rest of the science team, who work together to eventually defeat him by time traveling to the beginning of the game to retrieve their passports.

After defeating Benry, Freeman is captured by the G-Man (Spaghoner), who thanks him for taking down Benry and invites him to the birthday party of Tommy, revealed to be the G-Man's adopted son. In the credits sequence, the science team and the G-Man celebrate Tommy's birthday at a Chuck E. Cheese, much to Freeman's despair. In a post-credits scene, Dr. Coomer calls Freeman and congratulates him for beating the game, thanking him for taking the science team with him on his adventure and asks if he could bring the AI to the real world.

== Reception ==
Half-Life VR but the AI Is Self-Aware was generally well received by reviewers. Emily Rose of Ars Technica called it "exceptionally hilarious" and suggested HLVRAI's style of virtual performance was the next stage in the human narrative tradition. Kotaku's Zack Zwiezen stated it was "as good as [Freeman's Mind and G-Man Squad]", two other well-known Half-Life series, calling it "a funny and oddly compelling show". Quint Iverson of The Pacific Index stated that "the frequency at which Half-Life VR but the AI is Self-Aware turns me into a laughing mess is unparalleled". In contrast, Esther Warren of Loud and Clear described it as "trash" and "frequently stupid, frustrating, and hard to follow," but agreed that it still had moments of "unalloyed greatness."

== Spin-offs and sequel ==
WayneRadioTV has produced several spin-offs, including Half-Life: Alyx but the Gnome Is Too Aware, which started in 2021 and ended in 2023 after a year long hiatus. It follows the same player carrying a conscious garden gnome voiced using text-to-speech from hidden actors, to the end of the game. A sequel to the original series, titled Half-Life 2 VR but the AI is Self-Aware, began in March 2026, and is ongoing as of November 2026.
