= Half-Life VR =

Half-Life VR may refer to:

- Half-Life: Alyx, 2020 video game
- Half-Life VR but the AI Is Self-Aware
