= FLF =

FLF may refer to:

- Flensburg-Schäferhaus Airport, in Germany
- Flowery Field railway station, in England
- Freedom Leadership Foundation, a project of the Unification movement of Sun Myung Moon
- Front Line Force, a mod for the computer game Half-Life
- La Fayette-class frigate
- Luxembourg Football Federation (French: Fédération Luxembourgeoise de Football)
