= Black Mesa (video game) =

2020 video game

- Developer: Crowbar Collective
- Publisher: Crowbar Collective
- Director: Adam Engels
- Composer: Joel Nielsen
- Series: Half-Life
- Engine: Source
- Platforms: Windows; Linux
- Release: March 6, 2020
- Genre: First-person shooter
- Modes: Single-player, multiplayer

Black Mesa is a 2020 first-person shooter video game developed and published by Crowbar Collective. It is a fan-made remake of Half-Life (1998) in the Source game engine. Originally published as a free mod in September 2012, Black Mesa was approved for commercial release by Valve, the developers of Half-Life. The first commercial version was published as an early-access release in May 2015 with an abridged campaign, followed by a full release in March 2020 restoring the final chapters.

Black Mesa was developed in response to Half-Life: Source (2004), Valve's port of Half-Life to the Source engine, which lacked new features or improvements over the original version that used GoldSrc. Two teams wanted to improve on the Source remake and eventually merged to become Crowbar Collective. The project was originally slated to release in 2009, but was pushed back significantly for quality reasons.

Adapting Half-Life to an improved version of the Source engine and completely reworking the often-derided final 4 chapters of the game, set outside of the Black Mesa facility on the alien borderworld of Xen, lengthened the development efforts of the remake. Due to its long development time, the modification became notable for its delays on the status of its completion. Major changes include a reskinned collection of textures, models and NPCs, a longer runtime, altered level and puzzle designs, along with different enemy artificial intelligence, and additional dialogue and story elements. Black Mesa received positive reviews, with critics praising the gameplay and attention to detail akin to that of an official Valve release.

== Gameplay ==
Comparison of the Anomalous Materials lobby room in Half-Life (top) and Black Mesa (bottom)

Black Mesa is a first-person shooter that requires the player to perform combat tasks and solve various puzzles to advance through the game. From a design standpoint, the core gameplay remains largely unchanged from the original base Half-Life game; the player can carry a number of weapons that they find through the course of the game, though they must also locate and monitor ammunition for most weapons. The player's character is protected by a hazard suit that monitors the player's health and can be charged as a shield, absorbing a limited amount of damage. Health and battery packs can be found scattered through the game, as well as stations that can recharge either health or suit charge.

Unlike Half-Life: Source, which merely featured the original game's assets and geometry ported to the Source engine, Black Mesa has been purpose-built from the ground up to take full advantage of the newest versions of Source, not just for its graphical capabilities, but for its myriad updates to the game's physics engine, puzzle complexity, and platforming capability. The artificial intelligence of the enemy characters has also been improved over Half-Life to provide more of a challenge, with some of the combat spaces redefined to provide more options to the player. In addition, several narrative and design changes have been made to account for the numerous story threads presented via retcon in Half-Life 2. While most of the general design and progress through the game levels remains the same as Half-Life, the largest change in Black Mesa is the reworking of the game's end point, Xen, which was generally considered the weakest part of the original game.

Black Mesa also includes support for the individual and Team Deathmatch multiplayer modes from Half-Life on similarly updated maps.

== Plot ==
The plot of Black Mesa is almost identical to Half-Life's storyline. Like in the original game, the player controls Gordon Freeman, a theoretical physicist working at the Black Mesa Research Facility. He is tasked to place a sample of anomalous material into an Anti-Mass Spectrometer for analysis, using the Mark IV Hazardous Environment Suit (HEV Suit) to do so safely. However, the sample causes a "resonance cascade", devastating the facility and creating an interdimensional rift to an alien dimension called Xen, bringing its alien creatures to Earth. Freeman survives the incident, finds other survivors, and is tasked to make his way to the surface to call for help. Upon reaching the surface, however, he finds that the facility is being cleansed of any and all biological organisms – human or alien – by the military. Freeman learns from the surviving scientists the only way to stop the alien invasion is to cross over to Xen, a border world connecting different universes, and destroy the entity called the Nihilanth keeping the rift open. Freeman is teleported to Xen, destroys the Nihilanth, and ends the alien invasion. He is then detained by the G-Man, a mysterious interdimensional agent who claims his "employers" wish to hire Freeman. If he accepts, Freeman is placed into stasis; if not, he is teleported to his death.

== Development ==
=== Initial efforts (2005–2012) ===
The "Surface Tension" chapter as it appears in Half-Life

The same scene in a development version of Black Mesa

With the release of Half-Life 2 in 2004, Valve re-released several of its previous titles, ported to their new Source game engine, including the critically acclaimed 1998 game Half-Life as Half-Life: Source. The Source engine is graphically more advanced than the GoldSrc engine used for the original games. Half-Life: Source features the Havok physics engine and improved effects for water and lighting. The level architecture, textures, and models of the game, however, remained unchanged. Half-Life: Source was met with mixed reviews. IGN liked the new user interface and other technical features, but noted that it did not receive as many improvements as Valve's other Source engine ports. GameSpy said that while it was a "fun little bonus", it was "certainly not the major graphical upgrade some people thought it might be". Valve's managing director Gabe Newell is quoted as saying that a complete Source remake of Half-Life by its fans was "not only possible…but inevitable".

Black Mesa began as the combination of two independent volunteer projects, each aiming to completely recreate Half-Life using Source. The mod Leakfree was announced in September 2004, and the Half-Life: Source Overhaul Project was announced one month later. After realizing their similar goals, project leaders for both teams decided to combine their efforts; they formed a new 13-person team under the name Black Mesa: Source. The "Source" in the project's title was later dropped when Valve asked the team to remove it in order to "stem confusion over whether or not [it was] an endorsed or official product", which at the time it was not. Eventually, the team rebranded itself as the Crowbar Collective. Most of the team was distributed across the world and used online collaboration to work remotely, with some limited in-person meetings.

Originally based on the version of Source released with Counter-Strike: Source in 2004, the project switched to a more recent version released with Valve's The Orange Box in 2007. This new version included more advanced particle effects, hardware-accelerated facial animation, and support for multi-core processor rendering, amongst other improvements. The team had expected this to be a relatively fast project, with trailers released in 2005 and 2008, and an initial release estimate of late 2009, but by mid-2009, had backed off that date, and changed their expected release date to "when it's done". Wired included the game on their "Vaporware of the Year" lists in 2009 and 2010. In the lead-up to the 2012 release, team member Carlos Montero said that in 2009 that they thought they were going to be able to make that date, but "ended up busting our asses to make that a reality, and we went against a lot of our core values in the process. We found ourselves rushing things, cutting things, making quality sacrifices we did not want to make." Montero said then they decided to re-evaluate the state of the project, set higher bars for the quality of work they wanted to produce, and started to back through what they had already done to improve upon that, at which point they were not sure when the project would be completed.

The first standalone version of Black Mesa was released as a free download on September 14, 2012. This contained remakes of all Half-Life's chapters except the final chapter set on the alien world Xen, which the team intended to rework for inclusion in a future release, as Xen in the original Half-Life was often considered its weakest part. The development team estimated that the initial release of Black Mesa gave players eight to ten hours of content to complete. Black Mesa's initial release coincided with the launch of Valve's Steam Greenlight program which allowed users to vote for games to be put onto the Steam storefront. Black Mesa became one of the first ten titles to be voted on by fans and approved by Valve to be included on Steam through Greenlight.

=== Transitioning to commercial release (2013–2014) ===
A new version of the Source engine had been introduced by 2013 that, in addition to new engine features, included support for OS X and Linux platforms. However, developers had to pay to gain access to the full feature set of this engine. According to Adam Engels, the project lead at the completion of Black Mesa, Valve approached their team around this time and suggested making Black Mesa a commercial release and, thus, getting a license to the Source engine. The team considered this option, and, since access to the full Source engine would help make Black Mesa the best game they could, opted to go the commercial route to be able to pay for that license, not having originally intended to profit from the game. By November 2013, the team had affirmed that they had gotten Valve's permission to sell the game. Some of the team were later invited to Valve's offices in Bellevue, Washington in 2015.

At this point in 2013, the team cautioned that a final version was still some distance away, as they were still dealing with the updated Source engine, and they had not yet done much with Xen. Crowbar Collective continued to offer the free version of Black Mesa, based on the earlier Source engine, on their website. With the new Source engine, the team started to look more closely at how Valve had used Source in Half-Life 2, compared to what they had done in the original Half-Life, and developed changes for Black Mesa that reflected what they believed were Valve's design principles in Half-Life 2. One of those was the idea that when introducing a new mechanic, the level was designed to teach the new mechanic without potential harm to the player-character, followed by then testing that mechanic in a more harmful situation to the character. The team also included a brief mention to the long-fall boots from Aperture Science from the Portal series; Portal had come out after Half-Life 2 but loosely tied narratively to the Half-Life universe, and the team felt it appropriate to show the competing lab's technology within the Black Mesa facility from this connection.

Once the team had gotten all but the Xen levels completed in the new Source engine they were content with, they released these on Steam's early access on May 5, 2015, to get feedback and bug testing, stating that the Xen sections were still a work in progress. This version also included the deathmatch multiplayer modes with some of Half-Life's remade maps. Early access also brought Crowbar Collective additional support from developers and artists to help with finalizing the project.

=== Xen and final release (2015–2020) ===
The release of the Xen part of the game had been the most difficult, since the team wanted to redesign the levels to overcome the poor perception that they had in Half-Life's original release. The team said, "We want our version of Xen to feel like it really belongs with the rest of the game in terms of mechanics, cohesion and progression," while at the same time, they wanted "to push the boundaries and explore this unique and varied setting; to build an experience that feels both fresh and familiar to players from all walks of Half-Life veterancy." Developing their new version of Xen was a chicken-or-the-egg dilemma, as without level design it was difficult to develop art assets, and without art assets it was hard to come up with cohesive level designs. They also wanted to give more story elements there, such as why human scientists were studying the world of Xen in the first place, trying to capture the same type of world-building by level design that Valve had been able to with the first parts of Half-Life. They also significantly reworked the boss battles to be more challenging and representative of the area they had in mind. Ultimately, the team expanded out Xen from about a one-hour experience in the original Half-Life to four hours in Black Mesa.

In addition to reworking Xen from scratch, as the team members got closer to release, they recognized they saw the game more as an entry for new players into the Half-Life series, and worked to introduce designs and features that would be more appropriate a decade since Half-Life's release. They made combat more interesting by improving the enemy's artificial intelligence while creating combat areas with more cover and options for the player. Because of their expansion of Xen, they also wanted to make sure players were not slowed down in the earlier parts of the game, and made redesigns in some of these levels.

The release of Xen in the early access version of Black Mesa had been pushed off a few times; initially planned for a December 2017 release, a beta version of a segment of the remade Xen was released in June 2019 for stress-testing by players The full beta was released on December 6, 2019. Additional Xen levels were added over time, and by December 24, 2019, the full Xen chapter was released as part of the game's early access.

The finished Black Mesa was released for Windows on March 6, 2020. By chance, this release was about two weeks before Valve's official return to the Half-Life universe after 13 years with the virtual reality game Half-Life: Alyx. Black Mesa project lead Adam Engels said this was not intentional as they had planned to have Black Mesa out earlier, but the attention to Alyx had helped to boost interest in Black Mesa. In addition to ongoing support for the game before moving onto other projects, Crowbar Collective stated that they have been contacted by other teams, such as the Sven Co-op team, to help integrate their work into the final Black Mesa product. The team also wanted to incorporate support for the Steam Workshop so that other players could add their own mods to the game.

In addition to the modification itself, the game's thematic score, produced by sound designer Joel Nielsen, was independently released as a soundtrack in 2012. Nielsen released the score for the Xen levels in 2019.

=== Definitive Edition ===
Following the first release of Black Mesa, the team announced work on a Definitive Edition, or Black Mesa 1.5, revamping non-Xen levels from the original Valve design to make them more challenging, as well as to take advantage of new lighting features available in the custom Source engine branch the game uses. This free update was released on November 25, 2020.

== Modifications ==
As Black Mesa is built on the Source engine, it itself is also moddable with support for the Steam Workshop, and several projects have been started to create versions of Half-Life mods and expansions within Black Mesa.

=== Xen Museum ===
The Crowbar Collective released an expansion in April 2021 called Xen Museum that presents a virtual museum that documents the team's past five years of effort in creating Black Mesa and mostly their work in recreating Xen from the original Half-Life.

=== Uplink and Uplink Redux ===
In 2012, mapper Michael "Hezus" Jansen created the mod Black Mesa: Uplink, a remake of Half-Life's demo level, Uplink. Jansen worked on the mod for three years before release, saying "I've recreated something people played 13 years ago, that means it's intertwined with nostalgic feelings." With the transition from mod to game in 2015, Jansen returned to the idea and started work on recreating it for the Steam version that featured new content and updated graphics called Black Mesa: Uplink Redux. However, in 2019, Jansen halted the production of the mod due to health issues.

=== Surface Tension Uncut and On a Rail Uncut ===
In Surface Tension Uncut, the "Surface Tension" chapter was expanded to include certain areas of the original game that were not released along with the remake, as the developer had left before his work was finished. The developer, Chon Kemp, known on the Black Mesa: Community Forums by the pseudonym TextFAMGUY1, also modified the "On a Rail" chapter to include the areas cut from Black Mesa to make gameplay less tedious. Kemp was later hired by Crowbar Collective to remake Surface Tension Uncut for the Steam release, while the uncut version of "On a Rail" was published on the Steam Workshop.

=== Hazard Course ===
On December 29, 2015, PSR Digital released Black Mesa: Hazard Course, a remake of Half-Life's tutorial level of the same name. The mod had been in development from 2012 to 2015 for the original mod version of Black Mesa as Crowbar Collective had not implemented a training level in the game, citing its obsolete use due to Black Mesa's use of tutorial HUD hints throughout the single-player campaign. The mod includes an intro tram ride and brief meeting with scientists reminiscent of the PlayStation 2 version of the level.

In 2016, PSR Digital released an announcement that the mod had become broken due to differences between the mod version and the Steam version of Black Mesa. With fixes through the next years, the team re-released the mod for the Steam version of Black Mesa on December 29, 2020, the 5th anniversary of the mod's release.

=== Azure Sheep ===
In 2018, HECU Collective announced that they would be remaking the Half-Life 1 mod Azure Sheep, originally released in 2001. A demo of the mod was made available for download on November 18, 2018, with Part One being released in 2019. In 2021, the mod's next parts were postponed as HECU Collective focused to work on Black Mesa: Blue Shift.

=== Blue Shift ===
On February 16, 2021, HECU Collective announced that they would be taking a break from their mod Black Mesa: Azure Sheep and were now focusing on a remake of Half-Life: Blue Shift. Unlike another remake in progress, Guard Duty by Tripmine Studios, the mod utilizes assets from Black Mesa instead of creating it from scratch and is released in chapters. The mod began development after a previous attempt at a Blue Shift remake, Insecurity, was abandoned. Half of the members transitioned to working on the mod while the other half continued work on Azure Sheep. The first of the game's eight chapters was released on March 16, 2021, and as of November 2024, five of the eight total chapters have been released.

== Reception ==
Reception
2012 release

Aggregate score
| Aggregator | Score |
|---|---|
| Metacritic | 86/100 (Note: Based on nine reviews) |

Review scores
| Publication | Score |
|---|---|
| Computer and Video Games | 8.5/10 |
| Destructoid | 8/10 |
| Eurogamer | 9/10 |
| GamesTM | 9/10 |
| IGN | 8/10 |

During its development, Black Mesa received attention from several video game publications. It was featured in articles from Computer Gaming World, PC PowerPlay, and PC Gamer UK magazines. Valve published a news update about the modification on their Steam digital distribution platform in 2007, saying that "We're as eager to play [Black Mesa] here as everyone else."

The project was awarded Top Unreleased Mod by video game modification website Mod DB in 2005 and 2006. Mod DB gave the project an honorable mention in their choice of Top Unreleased Mod in 2007.

After receiving a development version of Black Mesa in December 2009, PC PowerPlay magazine said that the game's setting "looks, sounds, [and] plays better than ever before". The "subtle" changes from the original Half-Life were said to have a "substantial" overall impact. They also noted the project's "frustrating" then-five-year development time, and current lack of release date, but added that the developers were making progress.

After the first major release in 2012, early impressions of the game were very positive, receiving a score of 86/100 on review aggregator Metacritic, based on nine reviews. The game was praised for its high polish, with many critics comparing its quality to that of an official Valve game. Destructoid praised the game for the improvements it made over the original Half-Life, saying it was "something that felt very familiar, [but also] very fresh."

Black Mesa won ModDB's Mod of the Year Award for 2012. In 2014, Black Mesa was named by PC Gamer among the "Ten top fan remade classics you can play for free right now".

The remake's final release in 2020 was similarly praised by reviewers. On OpenCritic, Black Mesa was recommended by 100% of critics, based on 15 reviews. Writing for the UK PC Gamer, Andy Kelly said the project felt like a professional work. He found that while the original Half-Life structure hampered some of Black Mesa, the redesigns worked well, particularly the new Xen sections, which he felt provided more closure than the original. Eurogamer said that Black Mesa felt more like an evolution than a remake of Half-Life, with the designs of the Crowbar Collective to trim down certain levels while adding other features helped to enhance the overall product, making the overall title more of a survival horror than a first-person shooter. Dario Casali, a designer at Valve who has worked on all Half-Life games, remarked in an interview that during development on Half-Life: Alyx he attempted to play the entirety of the original Half-Life again for research, but after five hours decided to play Black Mesa instead, reasoning it was a much more enjoyable product.
