= List of Valve games =

Video games developed by Valve

Valve's logo

Valve is an American video game developer and publisher founded in 1996 by Gabe Newell and Mike Harrington. The company is based in Bellevue, Washington. Valve's first game was Half-Life, a first-person shooter released in 1998. It sold over nine million retail copies. Alongside Half-Life's launch, Valve released development tools to enable the player community to create content and mods. The company then proceeded to hire the creators of popular mods such as Counter-Strike.

Valve continued their trend of developing predominantly first-person video games in the 2000s with a number of critically successful releases. In 2004, they released the highly anticipated sequel Half-Life 2 through their own digital distribution service Steam. The game sold over 10 million copies and was met with acclaim. Valve released two subsequent episodes for Half-Life 2 and later packaged those games together with the puzzle game Portal and the multiplayer shooter Team Fortress 2 in a collection known as The Orange Box. By the end of 2008, combined retail sales of the Half-Life series, Counter-Strike series and The Orange Box had surpassed 32 million units. Newell also projected that digital sales of Valve's games would eventually exceed retail sales as Steam continued to grow. In the late 2000s, Valve released two zombie-themed first-person shooters focusing on cooperative gameplay with the Left 4 Dead series. The company continued to release multiplayer games with the launches of Counter-Strike: Global Offensive and Dota 2, both of which have large esports communities fostered by Valve. During the 2010s, Valve began focusing on supporting their established multiplayer games with regular content updates. In the late 2010s, Valve began investing in virtual reality and started to develop games and other software that make use of the technology, such as Half-Life: Alyx.

Valve is considered one of the most important and influential companies in the games industry. The reception of their games, along with the creation of Steam, has prompted some publications to list Valve as one of the top game developers of all time and the most powerful company in PC gaming. Newell received a BAFTA Fellowship award in 2013 for recognizing the impact Valve had left on the gaming industry in producing several successful game franchises.

== Games ==
Game	Details
Half-Life Original release date(s): NA: November 19, 1998; EU: November 27, 1998; JP: July 14, 2000	Release years by system: 1998 – Windows; 2001 – PlayStation 2; 2013 – Linux, OS X
Half-Life Original release date(s): NA: November 19, 1998; EU: November 27, 1998; JP: July 14, 2000	Notes: First-person shooter with single-player campaign and multiplayer deathmatch; Spawned two expansion packs: Half-Life: Opposing Force (1999) and Half-Life: Blue Shift (2001), developed by Gearbox Software; PlayStation 2 version includes an exclusive cooperative multiplayer mode, Decay, developed by Gearbox Software; Dreamcast version cancelled; In 1998, a few months before the game's release, an OEM demo titled Half-Life: Day One was released; On February 12, 1999, the second demo, Half-Life: Uplink, was released
Team Fortress Classic Original release date(s): WW: April 7, 1999	Release years by system: 1999 – Windows; 2013 – Linux, OS X
Team Fortress Classic Original release date(s): WW: April 7, 1999	Notes: Multiplayer shooter; Originally a mod for Quake, its developers were hired by Valve to remake it as a mod for Half-Life
Ricochet Original release date(s): WW: November 1, 2000	Release years by system: 2000 – Windows; 2013 – Linux, OS X
Ricochet Original release date(s): WW: November 1, 2000	Notes: Multiplayer jumping game with a Tron-like aesthetic; Half-Life modification; Added to Half-Life for free in June 2002
Counter-Strike Original release date(s): WW: November 9, 2000	Release years by system: 2000 – Windows; 2003 – Xbox; 2013 – Linux, OS X
Counter-Strike Original release date(s): WW: November 9, 2000	Notes: Multiplayer shooter; Half-Life modification; its developers were hired by Valve; Development began in 1999 with a beta and several more coming until 2000
Deathmatch Classic Original release date(s): WW: June 7, 2001	Release years by system: 2001 – Windows; 2013 – Linux, OS X
Deathmatch Classic Original release date(s): WW: June 7, 2001	Notes: Half-Life modification; Recreation of the deathmatch mode from id Software's first-person shooter Quake in the GoldSrc game engine
Day of Defeat Original release date(s): WW: May 1, 2003	Release years by system: 2003 – Windows; 2013 – Linux, OS X
Day of Defeat Original release date(s): WW: May 1, 2003	Notes: World War II-based multiplayer shooter; Half-Life modification; its developers were hired by Valve
Counter-Strike: Condition Zero Original release date(s): WW: March 23, 2004	Release years by system: 2004 – Windows; 2013 – Linux, OS X
Counter-Strike: Condition Zero Original release date(s): WW: March 23, 2004	Notes: Collaboration with Gearbox Software, Ritual Entertainment, Rogue Entertainment, and Turtle Rock Studios; Has a large bonus campaign called Counter-Strike: Condition Zero Deleted Scenes that has more tightly scripted levels
Counter-Strike: Source Original release date(s): WW: October 7, 2004	Release years by system: 2004 – Windows; 2010 – Mac OS X; 2013 – Linux
Counter-Strike: Source Original release date(s): WW: October 7, 2004	Notes: Remake of Counter-Strike in the Source game engine
Half-Life: Source Original release date(s): WW: November 16, 2004	Release years by system: 2004 – Windows; 2013 – Linux, OS X
Half-Life: Source Original release date(s): WW: November 16, 2004	Notes: Port of Half-Life to the Source engine
Half-Life 2 Original release date(s): WW: November 16, 2004	Release years by system: 2004 – Windows; 2005 – Xbox; 2007 – Xbox 360, PlayStation 3; 2010 – Mac OS X; 2013 – Linux; 2014 – Nvidia Shield
Half-Life 2 Original release date(s): WW: November 16, 2004	Notes: Sequel to Half-Life; Later bundled into The Orange Box
Half-Life 2: Deathmatch Original release date(s): WW: December 1, 2004	Release years by system: 2004 – Windows; 2010 – Mac OS X; 2013 – Linux
Half-Life 2: Deathmatch Original release date(s): WW: December 1, 2004	Notes: Standalone multiplayer component of Half-Life 2
Day of Defeat: Source Original release date(s): WW: September 26, 2005	Release years by system: 2005 – Windows; 2010 – Mac OS X; 2013 – Linux
Day of Defeat: Source Original release date(s): WW: September 26, 2005	Notes: Remake of Day of Defeat in the Source game engine
Half-Life 2: Lost Coast Original release date(s): WW: October 27, 2005	Release years by system: 2005 – Windows; 2013 – OS X, Linux
Half-Life 2: Lost Coast Original release date(s): WW: October 27, 2005	Notes: An additional level for Half-Life 2 released to demonstrate high-dynamic-range rendering in the Source game engine
Half-Life Deathmatch: Source Original release date(s): WW: May 1, 2006	Release years by system: 2006 – Windows
Half-Life Deathmatch: Source Original release date(s): WW: May 1, 2006	Notes: Source remake of Half-Life Deathmatch
Half-Life 2: Episode One Original release date(s): WW: June 1, 2006	Release years by system: 2006 – Windows; 2007 – Xbox 360, PlayStation 3; 2010 – Mac OS X; 2013 – Linux; 2014 – Nvidia Shield
Half-Life 2: Episode One Original release date(s): WW: June 1, 2006	Notes: First installment in a planned trilogy of sequels to Half-Life 2; Later bundled into The Orange Box; Subsequently incorporated into Half-Life 2 proper as of the game's 20th anniversary
Half-Life 2: Episode Two Original release date(s): WW: October 10, 2007	Release years by system: 2007 – Windows, Xbox 360, PlayStation 3; 2010 – Mac OS X; 2013 – Linux; 2015 – Nvidia Shield
Half-Life 2: Episode Two Original release date(s): WW: October 10, 2007	Notes: Second installment in a planned trilogy of sequels to Half-Life 2; Launched as part of The Orange Box; Subsequently incorporated into Half-Life 2 proper as of the game's 20th anniversary
Portal Original release date(s): WW: October 10, 2007	Release years by system: 2007 – Windows, Xbox 360, PlayStation 3; 2010 – Mac OS X; 2013 – Linux; 2014 – Nvidia Shield; 2022 – Nintendo Switch
Portal Original release date(s): WW: October 10, 2007	Notes: First-person puzzle platformer; Developed by a team including DigiPen Institute of Technology graduates who were hired by Valve to create a successor to Narbacular Drop; Launched as part of The Orange Box; First leaked in 2005 as a beta without GLaDOS, later shown again in 2006 with another beta
Team Fortress 2 Original release date(s): WW: October 10, 2007	Release years by system: 2007 – Windows, Xbox 360, PlayStation 3; 2010 – Mac OS X; 2013 – Linux
Team Fortress 2 Original release date(s): WW: October 10, 2007	Notes: Sequel to Team Fortress Classic; Launched as part of The Orange Box; Transitioned into a free-to-play game in June 2011; Had a beta before release and another released afterwards in 2010
Left 4 Dead Original release date(s): WW: November 17, 2008	Release years by system: 2008 – Windows, Xbox 360; 2010 – Mac OS X
Left 4 Dead Original release date(s): WW: November 17, 2008	Notes: Cooperative first-person shooter set in a zombie apocalypse; Developed by Turtle Rock Studios, who were acquired by Valve prior to the release of Left 4 Dead
Left 4 Dead 2 Original release date(s): WW: November 17, 2009	Release years by system: 2009 – Windows, Xbox 360; 2010 – Mac OS X; 2013 – Linux
Left 4 Dead 2 Original release date(s): WW: November 17, 2009	Notes: Sequel to Left 4 Dead
Alien Swarm Original release date(s): WW: July 19, 2010	Release years by system: 2010 – Windows
Alien Swarm Original release date(s): WW: July 19, 2010	Notes: Cooperative top-down shooter; Remake of the Unreal Tournament 2004 mod Alien Swarm; its developers were hired by Valve; Released for free along with full game code and mod tools
Portal 2 Original release date(s): WW: April 18, 2011	Release years by system: 2011 – Mac OS X, Windows, PlayStation 3, Xbox 360; 2014 – Linux; 2022 – Nintendo Switch
Portal 2 Original release date(s): WW: April 18, 2011	Notes: Sequel to Portal; Features cross-platform play between PC and PlayStation 3 versions.; Valve hired the developers of Tag: The Power of Paint to contribute to Portal 2's design
Counter-Strike: Global Offensive Original release date(s): WW: August 21, 2012	Release years by system: 2012 – OS X, PlayStation 3, Windows, Xbox 360; 2014 – Linux
Counter-Strike: Global Offensive Original release date(s): WW: August 21, 2012	Notes: Collaboration with Hidden Path Entertainment
Spacewar Original release date(s): WW: 2013	Release years by system: 2013 – Windows
Spacewar Original release date(s): WW: 2013	Notes: Implementation of the 1962 game Spacewar! using Steam API features. Hidden game on Steam storefront, usable for developers to test Steam API functionality.
Dota 2 Original release date(s): WW: July 9, 2013	Release years by system: 2013 – Windows, Linux, OS X
Dota 2 Original release date(s): WW: July 9, 2013	Notes: Multiplayer online battle arena game; Sequel to the Warcraft III mod Defense of the Ancients; its lead designer IceFrog was hired by Valve; Beta version launched in 2011
The Lab Original release date(s): WW: April 5, 2016	Release years by system: 2016 – Windows
The Lab Original release date(s): WW: April 5, 2016	Notes: Virtual reality game released for free to support the launch of the HTC Vive virtual reality headset; Compilation of eight minigames set mostly in the universe of Portal
Artifact Original release date(s): WW: November 28, 2018	Release years by system: 2018 – Windows, macOS, Linux
Artifact Original release date(s): WW: November 28, 2018	Notes: Digital collectible card game based on Dota 2; Designed by Magic: The Gathering creator Richard Garfield; Android and iOS ports were planned for release in 2019 before development on the game stopped
Dota Underlords Original release date(s): WW: February 25, 2020	Release years by system: 2020 – Windows, macOS, Linux, iOS, Android
Dota Underlords Original release date(s): WW: February 25, 2020	Notes: Standalone version of Dota Auto Chess, a community-created Dota 2 game mode; First launched in early access in June 2019
Half-Life: Alyx Original release date(s): WW: March 23, 2020	Release years by system: 2020 – Windows, Linux
Half-Life: Alyx Original release date(s): WW: March 23, 2020	Notes: Made exclusively for virtual reality headsets; Uses the Source 2 engine
Artifact: Foundry Original release date(s): WW: March 4, 2021	Release years by system: 2021 – Windows, Linux, macOS
Artifact: Foundry Original release date(s): WW: March 4, 2021	Notes: Expanded version with more features and streamlined gameplay; Demo of Artifact 2.0, Valve decided the player base was too small to justify continuation of the project so it remains unfinished
Aperture Desk Job Original release date(s): WW: March 1, 2022	Release years by system: 2022 – Windows, Linux
Aperture Desk Job Original release date(s): WW: March 1, 2022	Notes: Free tech demo for the Steam Deck
Counter-Strike 2 Original release date(s): WW: September 27, 2023	Release years by system: 2023 – Windows, Linux
Counter-Strike 2 Original release date(s): WW: September 27, 2023	Notes: Replaced Counter-Strike: Global Offensive upon release; Uses the Source 2 engine
Deadlock Original release date(s): WW: TBD	Release years by system: TBD
Deadlock Original release date(s): WW: TBD	Notes: Multiplayer online battle arena and third-person shooter hybrid; Beta testing by invitation began as early as August 2024; Working titles include Citadel and Neon Prime

=== Games published by Valve ===
List of published games
Game	Details
Codename Gordon Original release date(s): WW: May 18, 2004	Release years by system: 2004 – Windows
Codename Gordon Original release date(s): WW: May 18, 2004	Notes: Developed by NuclearVision and published by Valve; Also known as Half-Life 2D; Delisted since NuclearVision's bankruptcy
Garry's Mod Original release date(s): WW: November 29, 2006	Release years by system: 2006 – Windows; 2010 – Mac OS X; 2013 – Linux
Garry's Mod Original release date(s): WW: November 29, 2006	Notes: Half-Life 2 modification developed by Facepunch Studios; Initially released in 2004; its standalone release was published by Valve in 2006
Portal: Still Alive Original release date(s): WW: June 26, 2010	Release years by system: 2010 – Xbox 360; 2022 – Nintendo Switch
Portal: Still Alive Original release date(s): WW: June 26, 2010	Notes: Port of the original Portal with 14 bonus levels, developed by WeCreateStuff and ported as an Xbox Live Arcade exclusive. It is based on WeCreateStuff's Flash Version titled Portal: The Flash Version
Portal 2 in Motion Original release dates: WW: June 17, 2011	Release years by system: 2011 – Sixense TrueMotion, Razer Hydra (as Sixense MotionPack); 2012 – Playstation Move
Portal 2 in Motion Original release dates: WW: June 17, 2011	Notes: An expanded port of Portal 2 to the PlayStation Move (and as DLC on Steam)
Counter-Strike Nexon Original release date(s): WW: October 7, 2014	Release years by system: 2014 – Windows
Counter-Strike Nexon Original release date(s): WW: October 7, 2014	Notes: Originally named Counter-Strike Nexon: Zombies, renamed in 2019 to Counter-Strike Nexon: Studio, renamed in 2024 to Counter-Strike Nexon. Developed by Nexon
Moondust: Knuckles Tech Demos Original release date(s): WW: June 21, 2018	Release years by system: 2018 – Windows
Moondust: Knuckles Tech Demos Original release date(s): WW: June 21, 2018	Notes: Portal-inspired tech demo for Valve Index controllers, released on Steam but is unlisted
Aperture Hand Lab Original release date(s): WW: June 25, 2019	Release years by system: 2019 – Windows
Aperture Hand Lab Original release date(s): WW: June 25, 2019	Notes: Non-canon Portal spin-off developed by Cloudhead Games as a tech demo for the Valve index and HTC Vive

== Bundles ==
Game	Details
The Orange Box Original release date(s): WW: October 10, 2007	Release years by system: 2007 – Windows, Xbox 360, PlayStation 3
The Orange Box Original release date(s): WW: October 10, 2007	Notes: A compilation including Half-Life 2, Half-Life 2: Episode One, Half-Life 2: Episode Two, Portal, and Team Fortress 2; Ported to PlayStation 3 by Electronic Arts
Portal: Companion Collection Original release date(s): WW: June 28, 2022	Release years by system: 2022 – Nintendo Switch
Portal: Companion Collection Original release date(s): WW: June 28, 2022	Notes: Bundle of Portal, Portal: Still Alive, and Portal 2 released for the Nintendo Switch, made in collaboration with Nvidia

== Canceled and unreleased games ==
Several games announced by Valve as being in development have since been put on hold indefinitely or cancelled.

=== Half-Life ===
- Half-Life: Hostile Takeover: an expansion pack for the original Half-Life developed by 2015, reportedly cancelled in 2000.
- Half-Life 2: Episode Three: announced in 2006 with a release date of late 2007, and then put on hold, possibly cancelled due to scope creep, unsatisfactory internal experiments, and the desire to develop the Source 2 engine first.
- Untitled Half-Life 2 episode: developed by Junction Point Studios and led by Warren Spector. Development ceased when Junction Point signed a deal with Disney Interactive Studios to develop Epic Mickey. Valve took Junction Point's project and passed it to Arkane Studios.
- Ravenholm (also known as Return to Ravenholm or Half-Life 2: Episode Four): developed by Arkane Studios around 2006–2007, with Opposing Force protagonist Adrian Shephard as the player character and Father Grigori from Half-Life 2 in a supporting role.
- Half-Life 3: a version of Half-Life 3 was in development on the Source 2 engine from 2013 to 2014. Valve planned to incorporate procedurally generated levels alongside a "crafted experience" so that no two playthroughs of the game would be identical. It was cancelled as Source 2 was not yet stable enough to support full-scale development.
- Borealis: a virtual reality game led by writer Marc Laidlaw in development in 2015, set aboard the time-travelling ship Borealis. It was cancelled as it failed to gain momentum.

=== Others ===
- Untitled submarine game: one of Valve's earliest game ideas was for a submarine game, with Valve co-founder Mike Harrington seeing an opportunity to create "fantastic underwater visuals and gameplay". It is unknown whether it ever advanced beyond the conceptual stage.
- Prospero: a third-person exploration game with a science fantasy theme. The project was in development at the same time as Half-Life. Prospero's development team transitioned to work on Half-Life, which had gained more traction.
- Untitled role-playing game (I): a fantasy, action role-playing game about fairies that was in a prototype phase and cancelled prior to Left 4 Dead's release.
- The Crossing: a first-person shooter developed in collaboration with Arkane Studios. The project was announced in 2007 and put on hold in May 2009.
- Stars of Blood: a space pirate game. In November 2012, Newell revealed the project's name and confirmed that it was no longer in development.
- Left 4 Dead 3: an open-world sequel to Left 4 Dead 2 that was set in Morocco. It was cancelled when it became clear that the Source 2 engine was not yet ready to support full-scale game development.
  - Hot Dog: another attempt at creating a Left 4 Dead game, codenamed so that fans would not recognize it if its name were leaked.
- Untitled role-playing game (II): a fantasy RPG that was inspired by The Elder Scrolls, Dark Souls, and Monster Hunter series. It was at one point resurrected as a single-player RPG about the Dota 2 character Axe before it was shelved again.
- A.R.T.I.: a lighthearted voxel-based game that allowed for open-ended creation and destruction in a vein similar to Minecraft. It was resurrected as a VR game but shelved again when Half-Life: Alyx eclipsed its development.
- SimTrek: a virtual reality game developed primarily by the creators of Kerbal Space Program. It was cancelled during the development of Half-Life: Alyx.
- In the Valley of Gods: a period adventure game set in 1920s Egypt developed by Campo Santo, a studio acquired by Valve in 2018. It was put on hold in late 2019, with the designers shifting to other Valve projects.
