= Front Line Force =

2000 video game

- Engine: GoldSrc
- Platform: Windows
- Release: November 17, 2000
- Genre: First-person shooter
- Mode: Multiplayer

Front Line Force (Note: Sometimes spelled as Frontline Force, commonly abbreviated as FLF) is a multiplayer total conversion mod for the computer game Half-Life. It was one of the most popular multiplayer Half-Life mods. It was often compared to Counter-Strike and Team Fortress Classic.

== Gameplay ==
The game involves two teams, Attackers and Defenders. Attackers win if they capture all the points on the map, defenders win if time runs out. After a round is over, the teams switch roles. If a player dies during a round, they will respawn after a few seconds.

== Development ==
The mod was developed by Adrian Finol in 2000. Finol created a unique mod that focused on intense, fast paced game-play that set it apart from other total conversion mods. Finol's goal was to create an online first person shooter that was more 'team based' than Counter-Strike, with bonuses for acting with team mates.

Several versions were created under Finol's lead, each one adding new features and tweaking the game-play. In late 2001, Finol handed the FLF torch to Dave Dynerman so that he could start a new career with Valve Corporation. Several key contributors of the original FLF team now work for Valve.

Under the lead of Dynerman, FLF went through several upgrades, resulting in even more versions. Dynerman went on to join Raven Software early in 2003 and Tony Sergi took over as the lead coder.

Sergi created many versions for FLF, although not all became public. As the release of Half-Life 2 approached Sergi, along with the development team, faced a difficult decision. A great deal of time and work from all aspects had gone into the most recent unreleased versions of FLF (1.9 and Defiance), but the mod would have a hard time competing with other mods that were moving to the Half-Life 2 Source engine. Faced with a declining player base and only a handful of members left, the development team with real lifetime constraints for some, put further FLF work on hold.

== Critical reception ==
Reception

Review scores
Publication	Score
4Players	88/100
PC Zone	4/5 (1.0 & 1.3A); 90/100 (1.7A)
.NetGamer	7/10
Pelit	91/100

PC Zone gave a rating of four out of five to version 1.0, saying there are few maps but they are well designed and the weapon arsenal is comprehensive. They gave a same rating to version 1.3A and wrote: "It's not quite as involved or atmospheric as Counter-Strike, but it's more user-friendly [...]" They gave a rating of 90 out of 100 to version 1.7A and called it "one the of the top mods around". In 2007, PC Zone included the mod on their Classic: MOD column, writing: "The quality of its maps and weapons are what really sets Front Line Force apart from similar mods of the day." 4Players gave a rating of 88 out of 100 and called the mod a genuine alternative to players who want more than just team deathmatch gameplay. PCZeta said the mod combines the best of Counter-Strike and Team Fortress Classic and pushes the teamplay concept further. Xtreme PC noted all weapons as excellent and the map selection as magnificent. Konsolipelaaja noted Front Line Force as more polished and engaging than Counter-Strike. PC PowerPlay said the mod is more strategic than Counter-Strike. Micromanía said the graphics are quite good but the character animation leaves something to be desired. Level called the maps gorgeous and the attention to detail in them downright obsessive. Planet Half-Life wrote: "Front Line Force is the mod for you if you're looking for a tactical game without all the realism that's currently in vogue." PC Action called it a decent alternative to Counter-Strike with a small but dedicated fanbase. Maximum PC wrote: "[...] Front Line Force is a spiffy mod that blends the approaches of TF Classic and Counter-Strike and applies them to attacker/defender games."

== Successors ==
A trailer for a sequel, Frontline Force II: Defiance, was released in January 2003. In December 2004, Frontline Force 2.0 was cancelled and development was moved to Source engine. The unfinished version of 2.0 was still released on the official website. In April 2005, the new mod was revealed as Front Line Force: Classic.

A more tactical version of Frontline Force, titled Frontline: Tactics, was in development as a Half-Life mod in 2001. By 2007 its development was moved to Source engine under the title Frontline Force: Tactics.
