= Sven Co-op =

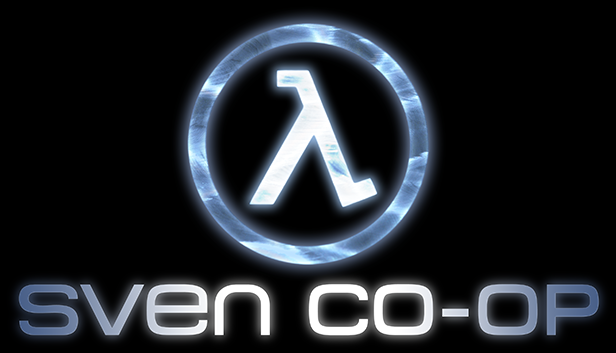
- Store art
- Developer(s): Sven Co-op Team
- Publisher(s): Sven Co-op Team
- Designer(s): Daniel Fearon, David McDermott, Josh Polito
- Engine: GoldSrc (heavily modified); Svengine (v 5.0+)
- Platform(s): Windows, Linux
- Release: January 19, 1999
- Genre(s): First-person shooter
- Mode(s): Single-player, multiplayer

Sven Co-op is a co-op variation of the 1998 first-person shooter Half-Life. The game, initially released as a mod in January 1999, and created by Daniel "Sven Viking" Fearon, enables players to play together on online servers to complete levels, many of which are based on the Half-Life universe but include other genres. In addition to the cooperative gameplay, Sven Co-op includes improvements from the original Half-Life, including improved artificial intelligence for both enemy and allied non-player characters.

Since its original release, the project has been overseen by David "Sniper" McDermott. In 2013, Valve, which owns the rights to the Half-Life series, gave the development team the rights to publish the modification as a standalone title on Steam, and further allowed them to distribute the maps and assets of Half-Life to support its release. The standalone release, representing version 5.0 of the mod, was released in January 2016.

== Gameplay ==
Sven Co-op is a first-person shooter based on Half-Life, using its GoldSrc game engine. The modification enables a server to be hosted, so many players can cooperate (along with any allied non-player characters) to complete levels against creatures and other enemies that are controlled by the computer. The modification was initially based around the levels from Half-Life, but since have expanded to include the other Half-Life games and user-made levels. Multiple levels may be connected to make a longer campaign by the level designer. The game can also be played in single-player mode, taking advantage of improvements over the original Half-Life that were made by the modifications, particularly the artificial intelligence used by non-player characters.

== Development ==
The game was originally created and released by Daniel Fearon. At the time, Fearon was one of the maintainers of the Half-Life fan website Atomic Half-Life, created in anticipation of the game's release. Fearon was sent a copy of Half-Life by Valve prior to its official release, and while playing it, he toyed with the game's code, figuring out how to spawn enemy creatures in multiplayer maps. Fearon's work had initially been done before Valve released the software development kit for Half-Life, requiring him to craft the modification atop the existing Half-Life distribution and to work with multiplayer over slower internet connections, such as phone-line modems. Fearon initially developed a single map that could be played cooperatively, and later a second version with two maps. The first public version of Sven Co-op was released on January 19, 1999, about 3 months after the release of Half-Life. He used the name Sven Co-op to reflect his online handle, "Sven Viking".

Contrary to the common belief that Sven Co-op was developed to play through Half-Life cooperatively, Fearon had wanted to create a means for players to engage in cooperative experiences together, often just spawning in large number of enemies for them to dispatch together on a single map. This drew a number of amateur level developers to craft mission-based maps for the mod, where players would be required to go to different areas on the map based on success or failure of a given objective. Such designers included Dave McDermott, who initially ran the Sven Co-op website before becoming a developer of it. Fearon had planned from the onset to include support for cooperatively playing through Half-Life's single-player campaign within Sven Co-op, but this was hampered initially by how the game's engine transitions from map to map, and made it difficult to keep players together in the multiplayer approach. Ultimately, the team was able to work this out, and later added support for Half-Life's two expansions, Half-Life: Opposing Force, and Half-Life: Blue Shift.

Around 2004, prior to the release of Half-Life 2, Fearon had been planning to release Sven Co-op on Steam, but didn't due to confusion between the Sven Co-op team and Valve. Further, Fearon and the team had started work on a Sven Co-op 2 in anticipation of using the Source engine from Half-Life 2. Though they had developed a large number of assets for the mod, they were hindered by the lack of the SDK, which had been pushed back along with the release of Half-Life 2. Many of the team members had started to move on to other projects, and Fearon found they lost too many key members to continue development. Around this point Fearon opted to leave the project, giving the project lead over to Josh Polito.

McDermott and Polito began negotiations with Valve to gain access to the GoldSrc engine around 2010 and to have Valve change some of the numerical limits originally imposed in the engine's use in Half-Life that would enable them to improve Sven Co-op. The two got official approval from Valve to release Sven Co-op on Steam as a standalone title in 2012, though opted to wait nearly a year to announce this in July 2013 to give their team time to develop a hotfix for the current version of the mod. This standalone title was released on January 22, 2016, and includes all the assets for Half-Life required to play that game without installing the original game; players are still required to have purchased and installed Opposing Force and Blue Shift to play those in the standalone release of Sven Co-op. The standalone version includes updated versions of the Half-Life campaign maps, improved versions of popular maps developed for Sven Co-op, and additional scripting tools that will allow level designers to further customize new maps beyond the default GoldSrc. McDermott stated that their team anticipates continuing to improve tools for level designers, such as being able to replace the game's default heads-up display, though as the game is still developed in the team's free time, there is no information on when these will be available.

== See also ==
- List of GoldSrc engine mods
- List of video games derived from modifications
