= Planet Half-Life =

Video gaming website

- Website type: Gaming
- Available in: English
- Owner: IGN / GameSpy
- Creator: Kevin "Fragmaster" Bowen
- Website: planethalflife.com (1999-06); planethalflife.gamespy.com (2006-12)
- Registration: Optional
- Launched: April 27, 1999
- Current status: Inactive, last updated August 13, 2012

Planet Half-Life (often abbreviated to PHL) was a gaming website owned by IGN and its subsidiary GameSpy. Maintained by a voluntary team of contributors, the site was dedicated to providing news and information about Half-Life, Half-Life 2 and related modifications and other Valve titles. It was founded by Kevin "Fragmaster" Bowen and was at one point the largest of an array of GameSpy-run gaming websites known as the Planet Network. Following Glu Mobile's acquisition of GameSpy Industries, the Planet Network has ceased to work, and subsequently Planet Half-Life has fallen into disarray.

== Content ==
Planet Half-Life's content consisted mainly of a news wire on its front page. Stories on updates, patches, press releases and events related to Half-Life and just about anything else concerning Valve were posted on an almost daily basis. These stories were also mirrored in the site's forum for reader comments.

In addition to the news, Planet Half-Life hosted extensive, in-depth collections of information regarding Half-Life, Half-Life 2 (along with Portal), Counter-Strike, Team Fortress and Day of Defeat. These sections covered overviews of each game as well as any official expansion packs related to them, as well as going over their storylines, important characters, enemies, weapons, cheats, walkthroughs, and, in the case of the multiplayer games, map overviews and strategies. The information found on the pages was original work drafted by the staff writers and senior editors collectively (although without any individual credits given, unlike other articles found on the site).

== Other services ==
=== Forum ===
A major feature of Planet Half-Life, and all other Planet sites was it's public forum. These forums included boards ranging from general discussion to technical help.

In August 2007, the forums changed their format to comply with GameSpy's ForumPlanet standard (the IGN SnowBoards system), removing some outdated features and adding many new ones, such as a dynamic news box that streams late-breaking news from not only PHL, but all other planet sites as well. This also changed the registration process for the forum, from a per-planet account basis to a network-wide, global account basis. At this time Planet Half-Life's sister sites Planet Fortress and CS.net were officially unsupported and their forums were to be merged into PHL's, although this process lasted over a year before it was complete.

=== Game servers ===
Planet Half-Life ran public game servers from 2006 to its shutdown in 2012, hosting 24/7 map rotations for Counter-Strike 1.6, Counter-Strike: Source, Day of Defeat: Source, Half-Life: Deathmatch, Half-Life 2: Deathmatch and Team Fortress 2. The PHL servers were maintained by Wolf Servers.

=== Steam Community ===
In addition to public servers, Planet Half-Life also had a Steam Community group.

=== PHLWiki ===
In June 2006, Planet Half-Life began its own wiki project based on MediaWiki. The PHLWiki contained over a hundred articles dealing with fictional Half-Life characters, creatures and locations in an in-universe, encyclopedic form as well as real life articles on mods, player terminology and strategy guides. Before being announced publicly, most of the existing pages, particularly articles making up the fictional encyclopedia, were written by PHL staff writers. The PHLWiki has since shut down.

=== Site hosting ===
Planet Half-Life also offered free web hosting for Half-Life themed websites. The web hosting was regulated through GameSpy, though the address of hosted sites were subsets of the Planet Half-Life domain. This was a major attraction of the site in its early days and many original Half-Life mod teams took advantage of the offer. However this feature has not been utilized nearly as much since the release of Half-Life 2. A directory of the old sites still exists, although most have been abandoned by their creators.

== History ==
Planet Half-Life ran from April 27, 1999 to August 13, 2012. Since then, it had undergone numerous format changes, both in content and aesthetic. The following is a timeline of major changes and other events.

- April 27, 1999, A small fan site known as contaminated.net is relaunched as "Planet Half-Life", covering Half-Life and editing resources.
- November 16, 1999, Major changes to layout and color scheme, plus new sections covering Half-Life: Opposing Force and the announcement of Half-Life 2.
- December 3, 2000, New sections covering Counter-Strike and Team Fortress Classic.
- June 19, 2001, New section covering Half-Life: Blue Shift.
- September 14, 2002, New section covering Day of Defeat.
- May 24, 2003, Half-Life 2 section re-opens amid rumors of a September 2003 launch and early media releases.
- July 17, 2003, Major changes to color scheme and graphics in anticipation of Half-Life 2 launch.
- June 11, 2006, PHLWiki is launched, with bulk of content made up by staff writers prior to public unveiling.
- September 13, 2006, Complete site format change to accommodate new PNAP article submission system, as well as new color scheme and graphics that were used until the absence of site updating.
- September 13, 2007, PHL Steam Community officially announced to the public.
- August 13, 2012, Last entry posted.
