= Characters of the Half-Life series =

This is a list of characters in the Half-Life videogame series, which comprises Half-Life, Half-Life 2, Half-Life: Alyx, and their respective expansion packs and episodes.

== Introduced in Half-Life and expansion packs ==
This section deals with characters that appear in Half-Life, Opposing Force, Blue Shift, and Decay.

=== Gordon Freeman ===
Gordon Freeman, PhD, is the silent protagonist of the Half-Life series and the playable character in Half-Life and all games in the Half-Life 2 series. He is a theoretical physicist and holds a PhD from MIT in that field. At the time of Half-Life, he works at Black Mesa Research Facility, a facility in New Mexico, conducting nuclear and subatomic research.

After being at ground zero during the "resonance cascade", Gordon fights his way through Black Mesa and eventually reaches the Lambda Complex where a group of surviving scientists are getting ready to teleport him to Xen in order for Gordon to kill a large entity (The "Nihilanth") holding the portals open in Xen. In doing so he frees the alien race of vortigaunts from slavery and is hired by the G-Man for an unknown future job.

In Half-Life 2 he is re-awoken from stasis by the G-man and meets up with the resistance on Earth against the Combine. The resistance view him as a very important figure due to the mythos surrounding what he did in Black Mesa. He eventually becomes one of the leading figures in the resistance, almost single-handedly destroying the Combine prison, Nova Prospekt, and signaling the uprising to begin. During the uprising, Gordon fights his way through the ruined streets of City 17 and enters the Citadel. He and Alyx Vance attempt to stop Dr. Wallace Breen from teleporting to a Combine Planet and blow up the teleporter he was trying to use.

In Episode One, Gordon and Alyx head back into the Citadel and slow the inevitable explosion so that they can get away before it explodes and so that the resistance can evacuate more civilians.

In Episode Two, Gordon and Alyx make their way to White Forest and activate a rocket to stop any more Combine Portals from opening, stopping another full scale Combine invasion of Earth.

Originally, Gordon's character model was much different, sporting a big beard and much larger head as well as the HEV suit being an olive green colour instead of the iconic orange, this earlier model has since been dubbed "Ivan the Space Biker". Gordon Freeman's final character model in Half-Life is based on Valve employee Chuck Jones, including the ponytail Jones sported at the time.

=== G-Man ===
The G-Man (voiced by Michael Shapiro) is a mysterious recurring character. He is known to display peculiar behavior, and capabilities beyond that of an ordinary human. His identity and motives remain almost entirely unexplained. He plays the role of an overseer and employer, both observing the player as the games progress and pulling strings to control the outcome of specific events throughout the Half-Life saga. The G-Man's constant appearances in the Half-Life games, as well as his revealing monologues with series protagonist Gordon Freeman, imply that he is of great importance and somewhat anchors the efforts of the player. His mysterious nature has made him an icon of the Half-Life series. During the development of Half-Life, after the designers discovered the usefulness of allied NPCs, the development team began to cast for characters who were "neither allies nor outright enemies, but existed mainly to create a sense of intrigue", which eventually led to the creation of the G-Man.

According to Half-Life writer Marc Laidlaw, G-Man was inspired by the character Slowslop in Synergy's computer game Gadget: Invention, Travel, & Adventure (1993), which Laidlaw had adapted into a novel in 1996.

=== Barney Calhoun ===
Barney Calhoun is the player character in Half-Life: Blue Shift and a major character in Half-Life 2 as well as Half-Life 2: Episode One. Michael Shapiro provided Barney's voice in the games of the Half-Life series. Scott Lynch, Valve's chief operating officer, lent his face to the game for use in-game as Barney in Half-Life 2.

Barney's name stemmed from the earlier alpha versions of Half-Life in which the model for the security guards held a resemblance to actor Don Knotts, inspiring comparisons with Knotts's character Barney Fife from The Andy Griffith Show, which in the United States has long been a disparaging term for an inept policeman or security guard. Initially, the "Barneys" were intended to be hostile NPCs who would attack the player.

In Half-Life: Blue Shift, the playable Barney progresses through Black Mesa to escape the events of the Resonance Cascade and is able to do so, in contrast to Gordon Freeman and Adrian Shephard, who are held in stasis. In Half-Life 2, Barney works as a mole for the Lambda Resistance in the Combine Civil Protection Forces. He provides the player information in the first chapter, leading him to Kleiner and Vance, and in the end of the second chapter, he provides the player with his crowbar. The fact that Barney owes Gordon Freeman a beer is a running gag in the series.

=== Adrian Shephard ===
Adrian Shephard is the protagonist of Half-Life: Opposing Force. He is a 22-year old corporal in the United States Marine Corps (USMC) stationed at the fictional Santego Military Base in Arizona who is mysteriously transferred to the Hazardous Environment Combat Unit (HECU), a special USMC unit. Three months after his transfer, he is sent to the Black Mesa Research Facility (BMRF) to defeat the Xenian invasion and summarily execute all BMRF personnel. However, the Bell Boeing V-22 Osprey transporting him is hit by a Xenian energy blast and crashes; he is rescued by a group of Black Mesa scientists, and due to never making it to his designated landing zone, Shephard remains unaware of the secret orders to kill all BMRF employees. Making his way through the facility while being observed by the G-Man, he eventually comes across a thermonuclear weapon brought in by the Central Intelligence Agency and deactivates it, but the G-Man later reactivates it, leading to the eventual destruction of Black Mesa. In the end, the G-Man reveals that he has successfully argued for Shephard's life, detaining him in some unknown void. The G-Man expresses a degree of respect for Shephard, offering praise for his ability to "adapt and survive against all odds" which "rather reminds [the G-Man] of [himself]".

Shephard is briefly mentioned in Half-Life: Blue Shift, where a HECU marine grumbles about taking over some of Shephard's squad's duties. Shephard was planned to be the player character of Arkane Studios' Ravenholm spinoff game, developed around 2007 to 2008, a project which Valve later cancelled. Valve also affirmed that Shephard had no connection to Portal after players found that the keyboard images in game showed the lit characters "ASHPD" and believed that hinted at Shephard's return; the letters instead referred to the long name of the "Aperture Science Handheld Portal Device" also known as the "portal gun", with the nearness to Shephard's name a "total freak coincidence" according to Valve's Doug Lombardi.

=== Rosenberg ===
Dr. Rosenberg (voiced by Jon St. John) is a scientist and a survivor of the Black Mesa incident. He first appears in Half-Life: Decay. When Gina Cross and Colette Green first arrive at the test chamber's control room and are receiving instructions from Dr. Keller, Rosenberg interrupts and voices his concern to Keller over having the anti-mass spectrometer run above 90% capacity, which is past the safety buffer zone for the equipment. Dr. Keller, however, dismisses his concern and states that the administrator's orders for this were clear. He tells Rosenberg that he can either stay and watch the experiment or return to his labs by the train yards. Rosenberg remains, and shortly thereafter the Resonance Cascade occurs.

Immediately after the disaster, Rosenberg converses with Dr. Keller and makes it clear that he believes their greatest responsibility should be the safety of the people at Black Mesa. Although Keller thinks that they should attempt to reset the displacement fields first, he eventually agrees with Rosenberg, and they come up with a plan to contact the military, so that they can help and evacuate the facility as soon as possible. Gina and Colette escort Rosenberg through the Hazard Course to a satellite communications center on the surface, where he is able to transmit a distress signal. Dr. Rosenberg decides to wait there for the military, and this is the last time he is seen in Decay as Gina and Colette return below to assist Dr. Keller. However, his voice is heard once more in the game later on.

In Half-Life: Blue Shift, Rosenberg makes his first appearance during the Hazard Course tutorial, long before Calhoun encounters him in the train yards. He can be seen behind the observer's window during the duck-jump portion of the training.

Sometime between Gina and Colette's last sight of Rosenberg in Decay and Calhoun's eventual rescue of the scientist in Blue Shift, he tries to enact an escape plan to get out of Black Mesa with the help of several other scientists. During this time, he is captured by soldiers and held captive in a freight car for questioning, while a colleague, Harold, is cornered and fatally wounded. Before Harold dies, Barney Calhoun discovers him, and he instructs Calhoun to find Dr. Rosenberg to help him with his plan. Calhoun is able to reach the train yards and free Dr. Rosenberg. Rosenberg informs him that their plan is to use the equipment in the prototype labs to teleport to safety.

He leads Calhoun to the unused part of the complex where two other scientists, Walter Bennett and Simmons, are already preparing the machine. Rosenberg instructs Calhoun that he must activate and align a relay device on Xen in order for them to be able to accurately set their destination. Calhoun travels to Xen and is successful in accomplishing this task, but after returning through the portal back to Earth (it is here that Gina and Colette in Decay, temporarily caught in a harmonic reflux, hear Rosenberg's voice calling Calhoun through the portal), they discover that they need another power cell to replenish the teleporter's power for their escape. Calhoun acquires a newly charged power cell from the lab's sub-basement and delivers it to Rosenberg and the others. Dr. Rosenberg then initiates the system and brings it online. They all narrowly avoid the military's invasion of the prototype labs, teleporting to the safety of an unnoticed access tunnel. They get into an SUV and leave Black Mesa.

Rosenberg's fate remains unknown.

=== Gina Cross ===
Dr. Gina Cross (voiced by Kathy Levin) is a Black Mesa scientist who first appears as the Holographic Assistant for Gordon Freeman in the Black Mesa's Hazard Course and then later as one half of the protagonists in Half-Life: Decay.

In Decay, Cross is the one who delivers the GG-3883 crystal sample to the delivery system and then heads to an area below the test chamber, where Dr. Colette Green is stationed, to fix a jam in the lift that allows the specimen to be delivered up to Gordon. After the Resonance Cascade occurs, Cross teams up with Dr. Green to battle their way through the now alien-infested facility. They first escort Rosenberg to the surface to contact the military, and then under the guidance of Dr. Richard Keller, they succeed in starting a resonance reversal to help lessen the effects of the dimensional rift.

In Half-Life: Blue Shift, Cross can briefly be seen on a security camera in the surveillance room, delivering the GG-3883 crystal. In Half-Life: Opposing Force, Adrian Shephard finds Cross's corpse in Xen after being teleported there by the Displacer Cannon, which implies that she died sometime after the events of Decay. Randy Pitchford, the president and CEO of Gearbox Software, had since confirmed this fate. However, Valve themselves never confirmed anything about Cross's fate after the events of Decay.

Cross was originally planned to be Gordon Freeman's spouse as well as another playable character in the original Half-Life, but this idea was cut from the final game.

=== Colette Green ===
Dr. Colette Green (voiced by Lani Minella) is a Black Mesa scientist and one half of the protagonist team in Half-Life: Decay.

In Decay, Dr. Green's role in the experiment is to make preparations in a room below the test chamber and initiate the Anti-Mass Spectrometer to run at 105%. Dr. Gina Cross also enters the same room to fix a jam in the specimen delivery system's lift mechanism, meaning they are both in the same place when the Resonance Cascade finally occurs. Following the disaster, the two team up to fight their way through the facility for survival. They escort Dr. Rosenberg to the surface to call the military for help and then, with the help of Dr. Richard Keller, manage to start a resonance reversal to prevent the dimensional rift from becoming too large to be repaired.

The outcome for Dr. Green, along with the rest of the survivors in Decay, is unknown to the other Black Mesa survivors.

=== Richard Keller ===
Dr. Richard Keller (voiced by Brice Armstrong) is a Black Mesa scientist, working with Colette and Gina. He appears in Half-Life: Decay. He is a 55-year-old, senior scientist in a wheel chair. He gives missions to Colette and Gina during the game. Keller also condemns Gordon Freeman and asks himself what Kleiner sees in him. His final fate is unknown.

=== Walter Bennett ===
Dr. Walter Bennett (voiced by Harry S. Robins) is a Black Mesa scientist. He is seen in Half-Life: Blue Shift.

In Blue Shift, Dr. Bennett is seen fixing a battery in Dr. Rosenberg's office, along with Dr. Simmons. The three scientists soon get it fixed with the help of Barney Calhoun, and they start their teleportation out of Black Mesa. The four successfully make it out of the facility, making Dr. Bennett one of the few known survivors of the incident. They open the gates and start their journey to the outside world with an SUV.

Dr. Bennett is briefly mentioned in Half-Life: Opposing Force. As Adrian Shephard traverses within Sector E of Black Mesa, he enters a testing laboratory where Xen specimens were being experimented on prior to the Resonance Cascade. He opens up a transmission intended for Dr. Bennett, revealing a hologram of a scientist talking about the results of an experiment conducted on a Barnacle, which was one of the Xen creatures being examined. Following the transmission, Shephard takes a nearby Barnacle specimen that was intended for Dr. Bennett to experiment on before the Resonance Cascade.

Dr. Bennett's final fate is unknown.

=== Simmons ===
Dr. Simmons is a Black Mesa scientist. He is seen in Half-Life: Blue Shift.

In Blue Shift, Dr. Simmons is seen fixing a battery in Dr. Rosenberg's office, along with Dr. Walter Bennett. The three scientists soon get it fixed with the help of Barney Calhoun, and they start their teleportation out of Black Mesa. The four successfully make it out of the facility, making Dr. Simmons one of the few known survivors of the incident. They open the gates and start their journey to the outside world with an SUV.

Simmons does not talk at all in the game, and his first name is unknown. Furthermore, his final fate is unknown like all of his colleagues.

=== Otis Laurey ===
Otis (voiced by Michael Shapiro) appears in Blue Shift and Opposing Force.

In the latter, Otis helps Shepard fight through areas of the Black Mesa Research Facility, opening a door and is not seen again.

In Blue Shift, Otis appears at the shooting range at the start of the game. He is trying to eat a donut and pull out his weapon.

== Introduced in Half-Life 2 and episodes ==
This section deals with characters that appear in Half-Life 2, Episode One, and Episode Two.

=== Alyx Vance ===
Alyx Vance (voiced by Merle Dandridge in Half-Life 2 and its episodes and by Ozioma Akagha in the prequel Half-Life: Alyx) is a prominent figure in the human resistance against the rule of the Combine over Earth and their human representative, Dr. Wallace Breen. Alyx is the daughter of Dr. Eli Vance and his deceased wife Azian, and she becomes a close friend and ally of Gordon Freeman over the course of Half-Life 2.

The 2020 VR title Half-Life: Alyx, which takes place between the events of Half-Life and Half-Life 2, focuses on Alyx and Eli Vance as they fight against the Combine's occupation of Earth.

=== Isaac Kleiner ===
Dr. Isaac Kleiner (voiced by Harry S. Robins), a Black Mesa survivor, is one of the leading scientists in the human resistance to the Combine. His character design is based on the generic "nearly bald, glasses (Walter, as its model name suggests)" scientist model from the original Half-Life.

Dr. Kleiner was one of Gordon Freeman's professors at MIT, recommending him for employment at Black Mesa to the Civilian Recruitment Division and working with him as part of the facility's Anomalous Materials team. He managed to survive the Resonance Cascade disaster of the first game with the aid of Eli Vance.

In Half-Life 2, he operates an underground lab in an abandoned Northern Petrol building. A teleportation system, developed jointly by Kleiner and Eli Vance, connects to Vance's facility, several miles away. As a pet, Dr. Kleiner keeps a debeaked headcrab he calls 'Lamarr' (after the 1930s actress and inventor Hedy Lamarr).

In Episode One, Kleiner appears on the video screens previously reserved for Dr. Breen's propaganda and instructs survivors to evacuate City 17, also encouraging them to procreate. He rallies people to prepare for the Combine's retaliation, stating that several new technologies developed during their occupation would be deployed as soon as possible to help fight the Combine.

In Episode Two, Kleiner is working out of the White Forest Rocket Facility with Eli Vance and Arne Magnusson on a device intended to close the Combine Superportal created by the Citadel's destruction. He mostly appears during radio transmissions while guiding Alyx and Gordon to White Forest, and argues bitterly with Magnusson, whom Vance states was Kleiner's rival for grant money at Black Mesa. Upon the discovery of the Borealis in Judith Mossman's decoded message, Kleiner expresses a wish to use the technology residing in the ship against the Combine, opposing Eli's vehement desire to destroy it in order to prevent "another Black Mesa".

=== Eli Vance ===
Dr. Eli Vance (voiced by Robert Guillaume in Half-Life 2 and its episodes and by James Moses Black in the prequel Half-Life: Alyx) is a physicist, researcher, and Harvard University graduate who worked with Gordon Freeman at Black Mesa. He wears a prosthetic that replaces his left leg beneath the knee, which was lost when he was attacked by a Bullsquid while helping Dr. Isaac Kleiner climb over a wall into a Combine city; this is not from any canon sources yet many fans and Marc Laidlaw, the story writer of the Half-Life franchise, have since accepted it. He is Alyx Vance's father; his late wife, Azian, died in the aftermath of the resonance cascade. The leader of the Lambda Resistance, Dr. Vance was the first human being to make peaceful contact with the Vortigaunt species and thus the "first collaborator", quickly persuading the alien race to ally with humanity against the Combine invasion of Earth. In Episode Two, Eli Vance works at the White Forest base before being killed by a Combine Advisor.

The 2020 VR game Half-Life: Alyx, which takes place between the events of Half-Life and Half-Life 2, focuses on Eli and Alyx Vance as they fight against the Combine's occupation of Earth. As a result of the events of the game, his death is prevented, albeit at the cost of his daughter Alyx becoming an unwilling agent of the G-Man. Upon learning the truth, Eli seeks to rescue her.

=== Arne Magnusson ===
In Episode Two, Dr. Arne Magnusson (voiced by John Aylward) runs the White Forest base and is described as a Black Mesa survivor. He gets on poorly with Dr. Kleiner due to their clashing personalities, as spelled out by their very names: 'Magnus' means 'great' in Latin, while 'klein' means 'small' in German and Dutch. Magnusson's peculiar personality seems to have gained him much respect from the Vortigaunts, such as his assistant Uriah, who makes awed references to him.

Magnusson also makes a remark to Freeman saying that if he successfully defends White Forest, then he will forgive Freeman for an earlier incident in Black Mesa, involving his 'Microwave Casserole', a reference to a scene in the first Half-Life.

=== Dog ===
Dog is a hulking gorilla-like robot belonging to Alyx Vance, built by her father Eli to provide both companionship and protection. Alyx subsequently upgraded the robot into its current form. Despite its name, Dog is anthropomorphic in appearance. Dog provides support to Freeman during training with the Gravity Gun, and makes appearances several times after.

=== Judith Mossman ===
Dr. Judith Mossman (voiced by Michelle Forbes) is introduced in Half-Life 2 as a physicist working with Eli Vance at the Black Mesa East Research Facility. Although she is apparently friendly with other scientists, her condescending attitude toward laypeople annoys Alyx. Over the course of the game, she is revealed as a triple agent who betrays the resistance in an attempt to form an alliance with Dr. Breen, then betrays him in turn. In the follow-on episodes, she is again working for the resistance in a remote location.

According to writer Marc Laidlaw, Judith Mossman was based on the character Elena Hausmann from his novel The Third Force: A Novel of Gadget (1996), based on the computer game Gadget: Invention, Travel, & Adventure (1993). He originally named the character Elena Mossman, but because it sounded too similar to the Gadget character, he renamed her to Judith Mossman.

=== Odessa Cubbage ===
Colonel Odessa Cubbage (voiced by John Patrick Lowrie) is a member of the Resistance against the Combine who speaks in distinct Received Pronunciation. He wears a jacket with emblems on it indicating that he was possibly once a security officer as part of the University of Rochester Security Services. According to Raising the Bar, his model was based on the martial arts instructor for one of the game's developers, and the name was found in a spam filter.

Odessa Cubbage leads a small Resistance base and town, dubbed "New Little Odessa", in a coastal region outside City 17. Before arriving at New Little Odessa, the player can see Cubbage speaking with the G-Man by looking through a binocular spotting-scope device. When Gordon Freeman arrives at New Little Odessa en route to Nova Prospekt, Cubbage is briefing members on the use of the rocket launcher against Combine gunships. Cubbage entrusts the rocket launcher to Gordon and never turns up to fight himself, instead staying behind to attempt to contact another Resistance settlement.

=== Grigori ===
Father Grigori (voiced by Jim French) is an Eastern Orthodox Christian priest who appears throughout the Ravenholm chapter of Half-Life 2. He is the only human survivor encountered in Ravenholm. Father Grigori's model is based on video game art director Daniel Dociu.

He speaks enthusiastically about "tending to his flock", i.e. dispatching the remaining zombie inhabitants of the city with a Winchester Model 1886 and homemade traps while offering them consolatory words. He helps Gordon Freeman intermittently in Ravenholm, giving him a shotgun, combat tips, and advice mingled with biblical quotations. Eventually, Grigori escorts Freeman through a cemetery infested with zombies to show him a hidden passage to the mines out of the haunted town. After waving Gordon off, Grigori continues fighting the hordes of enemies until he retreats into a nearby tomb, ignites a wall of fire around it and disappears, laughing maniacally. In the Half Life 2: 20th Anniversary documentary it is stated that Doug Woods thought of the idea in a design meeting as a "preacher with a shotgun". Grigori wields a Winchester Model 1886 rifle named Annabelle that can not be used by the player under ordinary circumstances.

=== Wallace Breen ===
Dr. Wallace Breen (voiced by Robert Culp) was the administrator of the Black Mesa Research Facility at the time of the "Black Mesa Incident", the events depicted in Half-Life, but he was neither seen nor mentioned by name (he was instead always referred to as "the Administrator"). After the Seven Hour War, he "negotiated" a peace agreement with the Combine that saved humanity at the cost of enslavement. Dr. Breen was appointed as ruler of Earth – a puppet of the Combine, who have little physical presence on the planet. In his propaganda messages to the people in City 17 (dubbed "Breencasts"), he often refers to the Combine as "our Benefactors".

Behind closed doors, Breen is shown to be a narcissist who is envious of Gordon Freeman's scientific achievements, with Breen's overall dialogue and actions showing that while he believes the Combine are a threat to humanity, he merely cares about "saving" humanity to ensure his own scientific legacy and to surpass Gordon's reputation. He doesn't care about the actual lives of the people he harms as long as his legacy is secured.

Marc Laidlaw has gone on record stating that Breen's narcissistic tendencies and overall characterization were inspired by the main villain of Thief II: The Metal Age, Father Karras.

The Half-Life 2 art book, Raising the Bar, has information that indicates Breen used, at least at one point of the planned story if not in the final version, a radio transmitter tower on the surface (i.e., not in Black Mesa) to communicate directly to the Combine and negotiate a surrender. Draft scripts for Half-Life 2 indicate that this would have been shown in an introductory segment to the game carried out through a series of projector slides. One of the slides would have shown Breen at the foot of a tower wearing a headset linked directly to it, with arms held wide and speaking to the skies.

Breen is alerted to the return of Gordon Freeman in Half-Life 2 when Gordon is temporarily teleported, by accident, to his office in the Citadel. Dr. Breen informs the Combine and immediately dispatches the forces at his disposal to capture Freeman and break the associated Resistance movement in City 17.

During Gordon Freeman's raid on the Citadel, Freeman is temporarily in the custody of Breen, until Judith Mossman turns against the administrator. During this period, Breen makes a very notable statement while in the presence of Alyx Vance and her father, Eli (who are also in his custody). He claims that Gordon "has proven a fine pawn to those who control him." He also comments that Gordon's services are "open to the highest bidder," and says he would understand if Gordon doesn't want to discuss it in front of his friends. These remarks imply that Breen may be aware of the mysterious G-Man and his influence over Freeman. It was also mentioned in one of the "Breencasts" to the Sector Seventeen Overwatch in Nova Prospekt; "I have good reason to believe that in the intervening years, he was in a state that precluded further development of covert skills."

When Judith Mossman frees Gordon Freeman and Alyx Vance in his office, Dr. Breen attacks Gordon by firing at him with the supercharged Gravity Gun; however, the charge does not kill him, and Breen leaves it behind while escaping. Gordon manages to stop him by destroying the Citadel's dark fusion reactor, which destroys the teleporter Breen attempted to use to escape in a massive explosion; the platform Breen was standing on collapses, dropping Breen from the Citadel to his death.

== Introduced in Half-Life: Alyx ==
This section deals with characters that appear in Half-Life: Alyx.

=== Russell ===
Russell (voiced by Rhys Darby) is Alyx's scientist ally and over-the-radio companion. Russell tried to get a job at Black Mesa, never getting the chance when the Black Mesa Incident happened.

Before the Combine takeover of Earth, Russell either downloaded all of or a majority of the internet, providing information to the Resistance.

=== Gary ===
Gary (voiced by Tony Todd) is a Vortigaunt that suffered a brain injury sometime before the game. He is severed from the Vortessence, meaning he is cut off from the hivemind composed of his fellow Vortigaunts and has been "alone in [his] head".

He joins Alyx as she rescues her father Eli from being sent to Nova Prospekt and later helps him get back to Russell's laboratory.
