= Black Mesa Research Facility =

Fictional laboratory in the Half-Life franchise

- Half-Life location
- Logo of Black Mesa
- First appearance: Half-Life
- Genre: First-person shooter

In-universe information
- Type: Laboratory
- Location: New Mexico, United States

The Black Mesa Research Facility (also simply called Black Mesa) is a fictional large underground laboratory complex that serves as the primary setting for the video game Half-Life and its expansions, as well as its unofficial remake, Black Mesa. It also features in the wider Half-Life universe, including the Portal series. Located in the New Mexico desert in a decommissioned Cold War missile site, it is the former employer of Half-Life's theoretical physicist protagonist, Gordon Freeman, and a competitor of Aperture Science. While the facility ostensibly conducts military-industrial research, its secret experiments into teleportation have caused it to make contact with the alien world of Xen, and its scientists covertly study its life-forms and materials. In a catastrophic event known as the "Black Mesa Incident", an "anti-mass spectrometer" experiment conducted on Xen matter causes a Resonance Cascade disaster that allows aliens to invade Earth, and is the catalyst for the events of the series.

Half-Life was critically acclaimed for its storytelling and level design. At the time, the integration of narrative into gameplay through scripted sequences and NPCs instead of through cutscenes was considered groundbreaking for a first-person shooter.

== Level content ==
=== Half-Life ===
Inside the test chamber, during the Anti-Mass Spectrometer test that sparks the Resonance Cascade disaster

In "Black Mesa Inbound", the player controls Gordon Freeman as he enters the facility on a monorail. After noticing the G-Man on a different train, Gordon departs and enters the Anomalous Materials Lab. He explores the area, donning his Hazardous Environment Suit, and then enters the test chamber. After the Anti-Mass Spectrometer power is turned up to 105%, the Resonance Cascade disaster occurs, and Freeman must escape the destroyed chamber. In "Unforeseen Consequences", Freeman returns to the Anomalous Materials Lab, fighting his way through the aliens that have started appearing from warps in space. He then makes his way through an office complex.

In "We've Got Hostiles", Freeman encounters the Hazardous Environment Combat Unit (HECU), a special forces unit of the United States Marine Corps sent to cover up the disaster by killing all of the surviving Black Mesa personnel. He travels through a series of Cold War-era storage rooms to reach the surface. Escaping an Osprey helicopter, he goes back underground in a different location. In "Blast Pit", he must destroy an alien tentacle that has appeared from beneath a nuclear silo. After successfully destroying the tentacle with a rocket engine, in "Power Up", Freeman must kill a Gargantua alien by baiting it into a room with giant Tesla coils. He then navigates a series of underground rail tunnels in "On a Rail", culminating in the rocket launch of a satellite that can determine the scope of the disaster.

In "Apprehension", Freeman fights through flooded rooms filled with aquatic aliens called Icthyosaurs. However, he is caught by the HECU Marines and dumped in a trash compactor. He escapes, and infiltrates a waste processing facility. In "Questionable Ethics", Freeman stumbles upon a secret part of Black Mesa that studies aliens. In "Surface Tension", Freeman crosses a hydroelectric dam, evading a Boeing AH-64 Apache. In "Forget About Freeman!", Freeman makes his way past a battle between aliens and the military to reach the Lambda Complex. In "Lambda Core", Gordon floods the facility's nuclear reactor with coolant, fighting off aliens along the way. Navigating through a maze of teleporters in a teleportation lab, he is finally allowed by scientists into a giant teleportation chamber that sends him to Xen, ending the Black Mesa portion of the game.

==== Opposing Force ====
It is revealed in "Friendly Fire" that government black operators have been sent into the facility to not only kill any Black Mesa personnel and HECU Marines remaining, but also to detonate a thermonuclear weapon inside the facility, thereby destroying the entire base and everyone in it. Corporal Shephard (whom the player controls), then defuses the weapon after a firefight with a few black operators. The warhead is later reactivated by the G-Man, and it detonates at the end of the game, destroying a significant portion of the facility and killing any survivors still trapped inside.

== Development ==
Series writer Marc Laidlaw initially conceived of Black Mesa, and brainstormed numerous potential names before arriving on the final one, including "Black Butte Missile Base", "Diablo Plains", and "Diablo Mesa". In Half-Life 2: Raising the Bar, he professed that he was glad his final choice was Black Mesa Research Facility, rather than "Black Butte". Black Mesa's themes of science and horror were partially inspired by "The Borderland", an episode of The Outer Limits that focused on a team of scientists who manipulated magnetic fields to enter the fourth dimension.

The monorail sequence that introduces the player to the Black Mesa facility was initially intended as a tech demo. Laidlaw stated that when a programmer implemented a new type of game object called "func_tracktrain", which allowed trains to branch onto different tracks, as well as bank and pivot into turns, he decided to incorporate a train into the game's story. The path of the monorail itself is made up of six different map files without individual loading screens, adding hallways as transition areas to give the illusion of level streaming.

The disaster sequence in the test chamber was created in a single weekend by developers John Guthrie and Kelly Bailey, who worked for 48 hours straight without sleep, ultimately exciting everyone in the office when they discovered and played it the following Monday.

== Reception ==
The starting monorail sequence became well known for allowing the player to walk freely around the train and look at whatever they chose, rather than be locked in place. Other scripted events that were notable for allowing the player to retain full control include the Resonance Cascade disaster.

The design of Black Mesa was characterized by critics as "mundane", and representing "workaday normality", however, its designers also gave its corporate environments "terrifying potential" by making it possible for aliens to spawn even in apparently empty areas. This allows for numerous potential places of ambush. Its visual design was called dystopian, featuring large amounts of solid-state hardware, much of which is malfunctioning or in disrepair even prior to the alien invasion. Scenes in Black Mesa have been described as "industrial disarray" and "bureaucracy run amok", while the facility itself was called "an amalgam of every top-secret military-scientific installation ever created or imagined".

The Resonance Cascade in Black Mesa was noted as being a metaphor for how the laboratory destabilizes the difference between "inside" and "outside". Its teleportation experiments caused Black Mesa's features to be reproduced upon "the planet at large".

== Legacy ==
Black Mesa's design has been credited as inspiring future cinematic shooters, including the Battlefield and Call of Duty franchises, being called a "revolutionary step" for the genre.
