= Half-Life: C.A.G.E.D. =

- Developer(s): Future Games Select
- Publisher(s): Future Games Select
- Director(s): Cayle George
- Producer(s): Cayle George
- Composer(s): Garrett "Lazerhawk" Hays
- Engine: GoldSrc
- Platform(s): Windows; OS X; Linux
- Release: September 21, 2017
- Genre(s): First-person shooter
- Mode(s): Single-player

Half-Life: C.A.G.E.D. (also stylized as Half-Life: Caged) is a game modification of Half-Life by Cayle George and Future Games Select released on September 21, 2017. Made using the GoldSrc engine, the mod includes a single-player campaign in which the player must escape from a closely guarded prison.

The mod was released on Microsoft Windows via Steam and was made available on macOS and Linux in December 2017.

== Development ==
The mod was made by Cayle George, an ex-Valve employee who previously worked on Team Fortress 2 and Portal 2. On August 17, Future Games Select released a trailer of the mod, with George announcing the release of the mod on the forum The Whole Half Life on September 1. The music was made by Garrett "Lazerhawk" Hays, a synthwave producer.

== Gameplay ==
The gameplay is similar to the gameplay of the Half-Life series, taking weapons from Half-Life 2. Instead of a crowbar, the player is given a plunger. The enemies only include guards and has a runtime of half an hour to an hour.

== Plot ==
The game begins with the player in a cell with other prisoners inside the Correctional & Automatic Guardhouse Electronic Detention. The player has to get out of the cell and escape by using the pressure of the pipe to blow it up, leading into a sewer. The player then makes their way throughout the facility while evading or killing the guards, climaxing at a battle at the docks of the prison to get to a speedboat.

== Critical reception ==
The mod received positive reception from critics and fans. Metrocop.net praised the game for its clever design and atmosphere. Kotaku praised the game for its shooting, calling it a "remarkable mod with great gunfights." The Daily SPUF criticized the difficulty of the game, saying that the normal difficulty was unbalanced with the limited ammo and health, as well as the weapons doing little damage to the enemies while praising its use of the GoldSrc engine to create the setting and recommended it to players. Alice O'Connor of Rock, Paper, Shotgun praised the game's visuals and atmosphere while criticizing the weapons and their lack of damage.

The mod was made a Classic of the Month on the Run Think Shoot Live blog in June 2020, and was the Editor's Choice for Mod DB's Mod of The Year 2017.
