= Demo mode =

Consumer electronic feature

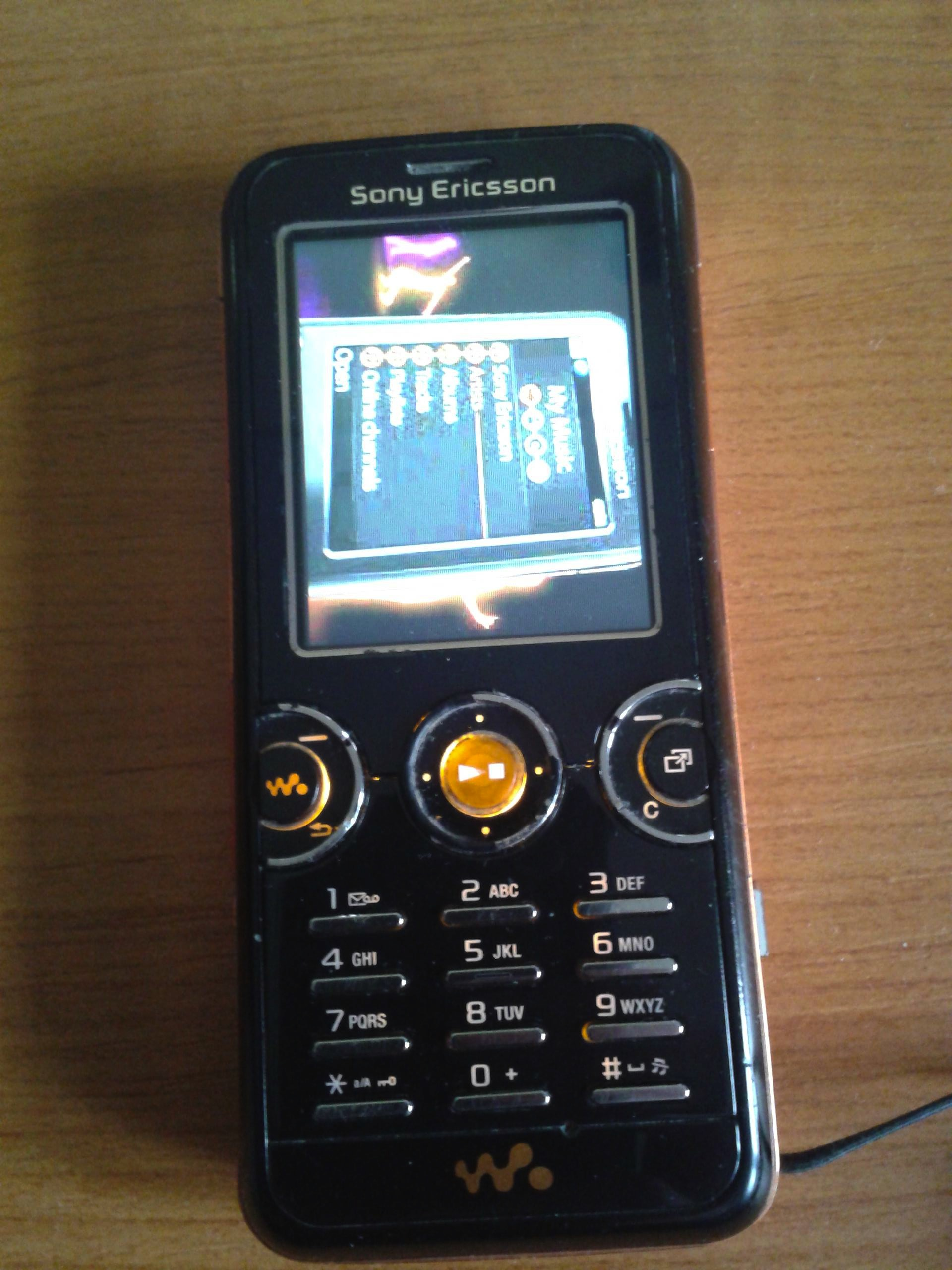
A Sony Ericsson W610i in demo mode

The demo mode (short for "demonstration mode", also sometimes mentioned as floor mode or kiosk mode) is a feature often found in consumer electronics. A demo mode is usually programmed into the floor model's firmware, which may be accessed by pressing a combination of keys and/or the launch of a program. Demo mode is usually activated by retail stores on their consumer electronics floor models. The demo mode may also be pre-enabled on the floor model. The purpose of a demo mode is threefold:

- It demonstrates the features of the unit in question
- It catches the eye of the consumer with a flashy show of lights, entertaining sound, or both.
- To reset or prevent malicious changes to the floor model.

The central idea behind a demo mode is in-store advertising, preview or premiere of the product.

== Usage ==
The mode itself is often present in the consumer electronics's system as a mode or a hidden file. It is not always present, but when it is, it is used in the floor models. The demo mode can be disabled ("unlocked") or enabled. The demo mode is present in phones, microwaves, TVs and other consumer electronics. The demo mode may also be available as a video or mode (like on the Sony Ericsson W610i), which can also be used as a placeholder when there's no SIM card installed. The demo mode may not be installed at all in the actual product, only as a floor model exclusive.

== Appearance ==
The demo mode itself may be a small video showing the features of the phone or a special version of the operating system (like on the PlayStation 3). The demo mode may also be unlocked or removed from the system by the user if that is allowed by the system without any intervention (like Android rooting or iOS jailbreaking). The demo mode may also be a core of the system, where removing it may break the system, in which case it should be "unlocked."

== See also ==
- Attract mode
- Technology demo
- Game demo
- Android rooting
- iOS jailbreaking
- Shareware
