= Cry of Fear =

2013 video game

- Digital release cover art featuring the main protagonist Simon Henriksson
- Developer: Team Psykskallar
- Publisher: Team Psykskallar
- Directors: Andreas Rönnberg; James Marchant
- Designers: Andreas Rönnberg; James Marchant; Jordy Boerema
- Programmer: James Marchant
- Artists: Andreas Rönnberg; James Marchant
- Composers: Andreas Rönnberg; Bxmmusic; Muddasheep
- Engine: GoldSrc
- Platform: Microsoft Windows
- Release: 22 February 2013
- Genres: Survival horror, first-person shooter
- Modes: Single-player, multiplayer

Cry of Fear is a 2013 indie survival horror video game developed and published by the Swedish game development studio Team Psykskallar. It is derived from a mod for the video game Half-Life developed by the same team a year prior. Cry of Fear follows the story of Simon Henriksson, a 19-year-old Swedish man suffering from depression and anxiety, exploring the city of Stockholm.

Combining elements of survival horror and first-person shooter mechanics, Cry of Fear challenges players to navigate through a haunting urban environment filled with monsters and unsettling occurrences. The story explores themes of mental illness and trauma. The game was praised for its atmospheric tension, narrative, and innovative use of the Half-Life engine. Cry of Fear received the Mod DB awards for Best Single Player Game of the Year and the Community Award.

== Gameplay ==
In Cry of Fear, the player controls Simon Henriksson, a 19‑year‑old who wakes up in an alley in Stockholm, Sweden shortly after being hit by a car. The player must navigate the city in a first-person perspective, solving puzzles and fighting monsters to progress. The game switches between normal gameplay levels representing the city and surrounding areas, and "nightmare" levels, similar to those found in the Silent Hill series. Depending on the player's choices, there are multiple endings, as well as various unlockables. There are tape recorders scattered throughout the game that act as save points.

The game features a limited inventory system that allows the player to carry only 6 items at a time, reminiscent of Resident Evil games, and does not pause the game while the screen is open. Simon begins with a switchblade and mobile phone, and can obtain a variety of melee weapons, firearms, light sources, and various other useful items. The small inventory space forces the player to decide what to keep or discard. Certain items can be combined into a new item. Another unique mechanic is the ability to dual-wield inventory items, allowing the use of two weapons at a time, or one weapon and a light source. Health is recovered by the use of morphine syringes, which can blur the player's vision if overused. Stamina is consumed through strenuous actions such as running and jumping, and can be recovered by resting or the use of morphine syringes.

A separate co-op campaign is also available for up to four players, following a parallel plot where the players control a group of police officers that also get trapped in the nightmare world while investigating Simon. Additionally, there is also a co-op survival mode, where players fight several waves of enemies for a set period of time.

Some days before Cry of Fear's anniversary, Valve released a Half-Life update for Linux compatibility, making changes in the folders and engine. This update made several Half-Life mods, including Cry of Fear, incompatible with the base game. Team Psykskallar decided that, since no more could be done for the mod itself, they would finish a standalone version. Confusion due to Valve regarding Cry of Fear's status as freeware caused the game to be delayed until April 25, 2013.

== Plot ==
The story begins in a dark and gloomy rendition of Stockholm, with the protagonist Simon waking up in an alley after a car strikes him as he is trying to help an injured man. Simon tries to make his way home, but is attacked and chased by deformed monsters. After failing to call the police, Simon receives a text from a man pleading for help. When he enters and searches an apartment block, he finds the man dead in his bathtub. Progressing further, as the apartment building slowly grows more run-down (and eventually covered in blood), a chainsaw-wielding monster attacks him and decapitates itself upon defeat, prompting Simon to vomit and pass out.

Simon wakes up near a cryptic and violent doctor who claims that he cannot trust him. After exploring the city and encountering more threats along the way, he finds Sophie, his childhood friend and love interest, on a rooftop. Simon attempts to confess his love to her, but she rejects his advances and commits suicide by jumping off the roof. A monster known as Carcass appears, giving Simon the choice to either kill it or flee from it back into the building. Simon continues on his journey home, attempting and failing to enter a subway station because he lacks a fuse. He goes to a nearby college to collect a fuse, however monsters ambush him upon finding it.

Escaping to the station, Simon successfully enters where he, once again, encounters the doctor, murdering someone. Simon gives chase until his progress is blocked by a door needing two more fuses. Simon enters the previously chained-up apartment and, after a long hallway where he hears a doctor describing an encounter with his patient and being attacked yet again, finds the fuses. While attempting to retrieve the fuses again to open a gate for a train, he enters another nightmare where he is chased through a maze by monsters hanging from the ceiling, escaping through a door that opens back up to a completely different hallway.

After boarding the train, Simon is attacked by monsters yet again, and the train eventually crashes and derails, causing him to lose all of his belongings. As the train is about to fall off a cliff, Simon narrowly escapes and finds himself in a dark forest. Deep in the forest, Simon discovers an asylum as the doctor enters. Simon finds the doctor behind a gate where the doctor orders him to hand him a new gun in exchange for letting him pass. Simon can either oblige or refuse, but regardless, the doctor ends up betraying Simon and shoots him (with a greater penalty to maximum health if Simon complied). Simon eventually kills the doctor after a gunfight.

Simon leaves the forest and rows a boat across a lake to his hometown. He finally reaches his house and expects his mother to be waiting for him, but the house is empty. He enters his bedroom and finds a book. Through a flashback, the player finds out that the entire story was a figment of Simon's imagination. After the car crash, Simon became reliant on a wheelchair. Depressed, his therapist (who was the doctor in the game) advised him to document his feelings in a book. The character controlled throughout the game was a concocted version of Simon, and all the monsters represented the trauma in his mind. Cry of Fear has five different endings depending on the player's choices.

- If Carcass wasn't killed and Simon didn't give the gun to the doctor, he kills Sophie, his therapist, and then himself. He leaves a suicide note stating that he would have killed more people if it weren't for his disability and wishes that the people who find his body are haunted by it for the rest of their life.
- If Carcass wasn't killed and Simon gave the gun to the doctor, he kills Sophie, then himself. In his suicide note, he apologizes to his therapist and thanks him for his help, explaining that he killed Sophie so that he could have her all to himself since he never got over her rejection.
- If Carcass was killed and Simon didn't give the gun to the doctor, he kills his doctor, then himself. In his suicide note, he states that the doctor's therapy only made things worse, and begs for Sophie not to know what he's done.
- If Carcass was killed and Simon gave the gun to the doctor, Simon, right before he kills himself, is confronted by Book Simon. The player, taking control of the real Simon, chases down and kills Book Simon in a shootout. Coming to his senses, Simon realizes he had a mental episode. Instead of taking his own life, he killed two police officers who were presumably checking in on him. Simon gets admitted into a mental hospital for the rest of his life, where his therapist continues to look after him. Sophie, despite how much Simon hurt her, visits him. Hopeful about the future and finally at peace with his demons, Simon finishes his book.

There is also a secret humorous ending if the player finished the game on the fourth ending at least once before and placed a mysterious package addressed to Simon in a mailbox:

- Simon arrives home to find the package delivered. Opening it to find pills, he takes them and ends up in a location from the team's previous game, Afraid of Monsters. At the end, he is hit by a car driven by the Afraid of Monsters protagonist, David Leatherhoff, then revealed to be the one who hit Simon before the game. David, who still uses a lower-quality model and talks entirely in text, apologizes to Simon, admits to being stoned, and flees the scene as Simon angrily yells for him to come back.

== Development ==
Cry of Fear began development in 2008. The mod was delayed several times due to time limitations before being released in 2012. During the 4 years of development time, many ideas were scrapped while others were improved. For example, the phone's flashlight was initially made to illuminate an area around the player. This was later changed to illuminate the area in front of the player. The inventory system was also reduced from 12 slots to 6. At its beginning, Cry of Fear used the standard Half-Life renderer which was later replaced by one from Paranoia, another popular Half-Life modification. Changing the renderer allowed the developers to bypass some older limits and add new engine effects such as texture bump mapping, specular reflection and 3D skyboxes. The game uses entirely custom assets and includes animated cutscenes.

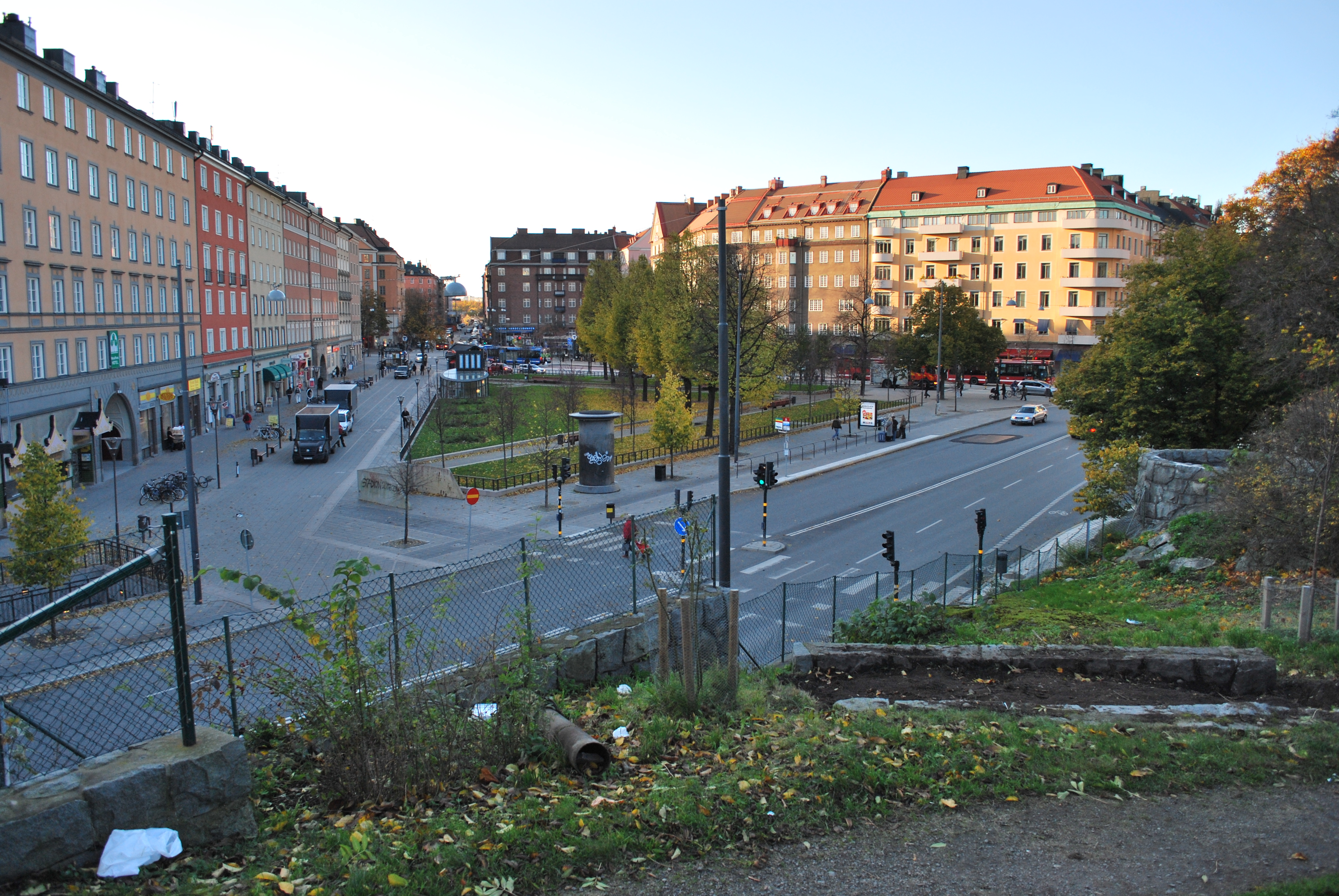
Sankt Eriksplan is the inspiration for Saxon Avenue in Cry of Fear.

Team Psykskallar (Swedish for "psych heads") consisted of Andreas "ruMpel" Rönnberg (level designer, music, and team leader), James "Minuit" Marchant (programmer, modeler, animator, and team leader), Stig "DragonNOR" Sydtangen (QA tester and voice of Simon), Lasse "BerZerk" Holmen (QA tester and voice of the Doctor), Jordy "Sporkeh" Boerema (weapons animator and modeler), and Aina Hatlevik (voice of Sophie). Rönnberg had previously created the Half-Life horror mod Afraid of Monsters (2005) by himself when he was 13 years old. The concept for Cry of Fear started when Rönnberg, who was going through a difficult time in his life, wanted to make "something damn sick and scary" and asked his friend Marchant to join him. The two began working on the project together, then later sought more people for their team.

Rönnberg took photographs of Stockholm as a reference to design custom textures of the game's city, which resulted in a photo-realistic appearance. For example, Waspet Gardens is modeled after Humlegården, Saxon Avenue is modeled after Sankt Eriksplan, and the train station is modeled after T-Centralen, the main central subway station in Sweden. The apartments are a replica of the building where Rönnberg's father lived, and one of the earliest created locations in the game. Harbor College is based on the college Rönnberg graduated from, Cyber Gymnasiet, and was originally a 3D project for a class. This allowed Rönnberg to work on Cry of Fear while attending school. Rönnberg also filmed himself firing various guns at a shooting range to make the gun animations more authentic.

Throughout the mod's development, Team Psykskallar released "videocasts" on the Mod DB page for Cry of Fear, which were medium-length videos that documented the team's development on the mod, as well as showcased new and improved features. The videos consisted of various team members, but most notably Rönnberg, Marchant, and Sydtangen.

== Reception ==
Cry of Fear has received generally positive reviews, with reviewers praising its overall atmosphere and unique setting. Reviewers praised the game's story, atmosphere, tension, enemy designs, and inventory management, while some criticism was levied at the game's platforming segments and occasional crashes and bugs. Eric Sapp of IGN called the game "terrifying" and praised the addition of an inventory system with limited space similar to Resident Evil series for the decision making aspect. Antony Wright of SUPERJUMP named Cry of Fear "arguably the most disturbing and depraved horror title that I've ever played through" while also commending the game for sympathetically handling mature topics. Dennis Moiseyev and Destry Stutesman of The Gamer positively compared Cry of Fear to the Silent Hill series through its use of nightmare sequences, while employing a first-person perspective.

Luke Plunkett of Kotaku opined that while the old engine made the game "a little janky" at times, the graphics and music in Cry of Fear were "genuinely tense". A review on Jeuxvideo.com praised the innovations to the GoldSrc engine, calling the improved the graphics and lighting in Cry of Fear unrecognized to Half-Life. Although acknowledging the technical limitations of an outdated engine, the music and "gloomy atmosphere" were also applauded by Jeuxvideo.com, stating the game proves "that a graphics engine, no matter how old it may be, can do some very beautiful things if it is used well". Adam Smith of Rock Paper Shotgun considered the older engine to be an attribute to the game's horror elements: "There's something about the look and feel of the dated engine that unnerves me far more than something draped in bells and whistles ever would..".

In December 2012, Cry of Fear received several awards from Mod DB, including the main category Best Single Player Game of the Year and the Community Award.

== Future ==
Rönnberg has stated there will not be a sequel to Cry of Fear, as he considers the story completed. A remake was in development by Team Psykskallar, but production time and cost surpassed the original game and the project was abandoned. In August 2023, Rönnberg revealed he has been planning a new horror game, similar to both Afraid of Monsters and Cry of Fear, and the game was currently in the early writing phase.
