= Mainframe (disambiguation) =

A mainframe computer is a type of large data processing system.

Mainframe may also refer to:

- Mainframe Studios, a Canadian computer animation company founded as Mainframe Entertainment

== Fictional entities ==
- Mainframe (comics), several Marvel Comics characters
- Mainframe (G.I. Joe), a character in the G.I. Joe universe
- Mainframe, a character from the game Gunman Chronicles
- Mainframe, the city in the animated series ReBoot
- Tina "Mainframe" Cassidy, a character from the animated TV series COPS
- Mainframe, a character in Gene Wolfe's series of novels The Book of the Long Sun
