= They Hunger =

- Developer: Black Widow Games
- Designer: Neil Manke
- Engine: GoldSrc
- Platform: Windows
- Release: February 2000 (TH1); September 2000 (TH2); June 2001 (TH3)
- Genre: First-person shooter
- Modes: Single-player, multiplayer

They Hunger is a single player horror-based mod of Valve's first-person shooter Half-Life. It was released by Neil Manke's Black Widow Games in three episodes, They Hunger (2000), They Hunger 2: Rest in Pieces (2000), and They Hunger 3: Rude Awakening (2001). All three episodes were sponsored by PC Gamer and appeared on the magazine's cover disk. The original mod received positive reviews from critics; who commended the project's quality, horror elements, and the way it used the GoldSrc engine. A fourth game made for the Source engine, They Hunger: Lost Souls, was cancelled.

== Features ==
A zombie is attacking the player.

They Hunger features little original Half-Life content apart from the revolver, some sound clips, a few types of ammunition the player can pick up, and a few other minor details, although many weapons and NPCs are simply re-skins of the content in Half-Life. For example, the civilians are re-skins of a scientist found in Half-Life. It also includes the flamethrower and sniper rifle from Team Fortress Classic, though it features a different view when scoped. In addition to these modifications, it changes the sounds of certain characters. For example, one friendly NPC features the same sound clips as Barney Calhoun from Half-Life but has been edited to affect a deeper voice. Zombies and headcrabs have also been given voices, which add to the horror aspect of the game.

Two deathmatch maps were released separately ahead of the first episode's release. They Hunger 2 and 3 include a multiplayer deathmatch mode.

Barking Dog Studios and Gooseman were reported to be involved in the production of They Hunger 2.

== Story ==
=== Setting ===
They Hunger takes place in a town called Rockwell, also called "the valley" by Deputy Jerry Hobbs. The location of the town is never revealed. The town is surrounded by many cliffs and canyons; many sections of the town are separated by tunnel systems. On the outskirts, there is "Rockwell Stud Bulls," a family-owned cattle company. One of the town's more notable landmarks is a large volcanic chasm, which appears to be the town's main tourist attraction dubbed "Devil's Rift." It also has a Stonehenge-type structure. The town has its own local radio station, BMRF Radio (a reference to the Black Mesa Research Facility from the Half-Life series).

=== They Hunger ===
In the first episode, the player takes the role of a troubled writer who has gone to a country retreat to work on his next masterpiece. However, the player soon hears the news over the radio of 'strange atmospheric phenomena', and his car crashes into a lake after being struck by a lightning bolt. Severely wounded and armed only with a recharging flashlight, the player moves out to find help. His only means of escaping the lake is by swimming through a drainage pipe into a maze of catacombs. He comes to a mortuary chapel and finds an umbrella and medkits to heal himself with. Along the way, he's had several disturbing experiences: an unfinished catacomb is empty and has a splash of blood near it. The pathways are echoing screams of the damned. A bloodied skull rolls out of an ossuary, and as he enters the chapel, he hears someone screaming "No! No! Get it off me!", from who he takes his umbrella. As soon as he starts to leave, strange things start happening. A zombie breaks through a coffin and starts chasing him. The player has to smash the zombie down with the handle of the umbrella he took. He climbs the ladder to the church bell, only to find hostile headcrab-like creatures and a dead body. He takes a silenced 9mm Beretta pistol and rings the church bell for help. A vent opens and he climbs in to find some dynamite. The writer finds himself fighting for survival against zombies, going through the church grounds, passing a swamp, running in a volcano rift (called Devil's rift), driving a train through tracks full of zombies, and finally getting into the town, where finds the BMRF radio station and the police station, his main destination. To make things worse, the police who have been sent to investigate the strange happenings have also been turned into zombies and are still capable of using weapons and equipment, and prove to be a constant threat (as well as a source of ammunition). Once the player gets into town, he uses the local radio station to call for the state police. In the end, the player is captured by the undead sheriff and imprisoned. The episode ends with a zombie approaching his cell door to eat him.

=== They Hunger 2: Rest in Pieces ===
The protagonist begins the game where the last left off: unarmed and trapped, however just as a zombie is about to enter his cell, the player is saved by a state police officer with a military-equipped truck. Still unarmed, the player is forced to restock his arsenal himself (though it is possible to re-enter the police station and regain several lost weapons).

The player soon after enters the sewers. There he encounters bizarre aquatic creatures. He also encounters several state police officers who have been zombified after arriving at the town. The player later makes it to the Rockwell water treatment plant. It becomes apparent that the military has taken notice of the problem and had started sending troops in to take care of the zombies and determine what was happening to the civilians. However, the player does not actually meet up with any living soldiers (as they are quickly killed by zombies when encountered) until the next episode.

A major part of this episode is spent exploring 'Rockwell Asylum for the Criminally Insane' operated by Dr. Franklin (who could possibly have created the headcrabs from the previous chapter). Once inside, the player meets Alfred, Dr. Franklin's former assistant, who tells the player that it was he and Dr. Franklin that discovered strange contaminants in the city water that brings anyone alive or dead to an intermediate state of half life. He tells the player that Dr. Franklin was trying to figure out how it was causing the zombies but ended up being infected too.

The player then enters Dr. Franklin's underground laboratory where he witnesses several of the doctor's horrid experiments, such as dismembered heads being kept alive. Soon the player is forced to fight an army of undead Frankenstein-like monsters brought to life through Franklin's machine. Shortly after, Dr. Franklin is chased out of the area by one of his own monsters.

The episode ends with the player inadvertently setting the whole asylum aflame. The player is caught in a massive explosion that ends the episode.

=== They Hunger 3: Rude Awakening ===
The final episode opens as the player awakens to find himself in Rockwell Community Hospital. A little exploration reveals that it, too, had been overrun by zombies before the player woke up. The player's fight continues. The player must find a way out of the hospital. After the player leaves the hospital, he, on foot, covers several miles of open countryside and arrives at a small farm that has been overrun by the undead. Besides the farmers, most of the local cattle and other animals have also been infected and prove to be quite a danger. To make matters worse, the human skeletons that have been resurrected through experimentation in the previous episode now appear frequently and have the dangerous ability to channel electricity.

Eventually, the player manages to get back to the asylum which has been destroyed by the fire. However, the player is recaptured and taken back to the country-side to a Stonehenge-like structure. Here the player witnesses Sheriff Rockwood giving a speech to the zombie hordes, which is soon broken up when the military attacks. The soldiers also target the player and any surviving civilians (probably because of the risk of infection) The player escapes and retrace his steps back to the farm train yard, along the way witnessing the fact that the military is clearly overwhelmed by the zombie threat. After boarding a rail car, he once again arrives at the asylum. There he meets a lone deputy who has a plan to get himself and the player out of the town using a police helicopter. However, he can't open the hatch by himself. The player must fight through the asylum and the local theater, which is now overrun with zombified soldiers, to meet him on the other side. The player and the deputy take off in a police helicopter.

The game reaches its climax as the player and the deputy are forced to fight Dr. Franklin, who, after taking the full impact of the blast in episode 2, has been rebuilt into a half-zombie, half-machine cyborg. After the doctor's defeat, the player is pursued by Sheriff Rockwood in another helicopter with a mounted mini-gun. The player must defeat the sheriff and send him plummeting toward one of the great lakes before exploding. The game ends with the player and the deputy flying off into the sunrise while the game plays "You Are What I Eat" along with the end credits.

== Reception ==
Reception

Review scores
Publication	Score
PC PowerPlay	90% (TH3)
PCZeta	92% (TH1)

Giochi per il mio computer called the first episode professional product and an extremely compelling horror adventure. PCZeta said They Hunger has masterful use of lighting, creepy sound effects and ingenious level design. PC Player said They Hunger is the most acclaimed single-player Half-Life mod among the fan community. CNET Gamecenter placed it on its list of top 10 Half-Life mods, writing: "They Hunger is the best horror-themed first-person shooter since the original Blood." Planet Half-Life wrote about the first episode in 2000: "In short, the dark atmosphere is there, the weapon balance is right on, and the immersion is near-total." In 2006, they wrote: "Its sweet blend of ambience, satisfyingly intense close-quarters zombie combat (or SICQZC for short), and slick manner of horror panache make it a must-download."

MegaGame noted the second episode as an excellent sequel to a remarkable game. .NetGamer called the map design and gameplay of They Hunger 2 spectacular and said it's a must-have for every Half-Life fan. GameSpot noted They Hunger 2 as Manke's current magnum opus. Level liked the second episode more than the first one. They said it's longer and more visually appealing. The levels were noted as very well crafted. Planet Half-Life said the second episode has "a tangibly different feel" and more emphasis on gunplay.

PC PowerPlay wrote about the third episode: "It's based on ageing technology and it possibly runs a little too close to predictable (scare-wise) at times, but overall it hits just the right marks to make you want to keep on playing." Planet Half-Life said the third episode is about the same quality as the previous ones.

PC Player said since the mod has different weapons, enemies, and textures from Half-Life, it creates a "unique splatter atmosphere". IGN wrote about the series: "The real pull They Hunger provides is it's absolutely, shockingly, brilliant freakiness. Everything, and I do mean everything about the game is scary." Hacker recommended the mod to fans of Half-Life and horror games. Click! said the mod has an incredible horror atmosphere and is at the absolute top of first-person horror games. The Games Machine called They Hunger a trio of classic single-player mods. In 2018, PC Gamer wrote: "What made They Hunger stand out, and what makes it stand out today, is how the quality of its level and setpiece design rivals that of the game it's based upon."

== They Hunger: Lost Souls ==
A commercial sequel, They Hunger: Lost Souls, was announced on October 20, 2005. It was developed on the Source engine and was 75% complete at the time of the announcement. The game was set in North-Eastern Europe during the early 1960's. The development of the game stopped after 2008. Two playable alpha builds were leaked in 2019.

== See also ==
- List of GoldSrc engine mods
