= Day of Defeat: Source =

2005 video game

- Box cover showing an Allied and Axis soldier, representing the two teams
- Developer: Valve
- Publisher: Valve
- Composer: Dan Haigh
- Engine: Source
- Platforms: Microsoft Windows, Mac OS X, Linux
- Release: September 26, 2005: Windows; WW: September 26, 2005; Mac OS X; WW: July 12, 2010; Linux; WW: March 29, 2013
- Genre: First-person shooter
- Mode: Multiplayer

Day of Defeat: Source is a team-based online first-person shooter multiplayer video game developed by Valve. Set in World War II, the game is a remake of Day of Defeat. It was updated from the GoldSrc engine used by its predecessor to the Source engine, and a remake of the game models. The game was released for Microsoft Windows on September 26, 2005, distributed through Valve's online content delivery service Steam. Retail distribution of the game was handled by Electronic Arts.

The game was announced in February 2005. During the course of its development, Day of Defeat: Source progressed from being a straight conversion of Day of Defeat, to the alteration of certain aspects of the game's design and introduction of several features. In addition, Day of Defeat: Source has been used by Valve to present new design features on the Source engine, such as high dynamic range rendering and cinematic effects. The game itself revolves around two teams, the U.S. Army and the Wehrmacht, each with access to six player classes, fighting in a variety of scenarios inspired by World War II engagements in the European Theatre of 1944.

Upon release, the game received a generally favorable reception, praised for its atmospheric and strategic gameplay and its graphics, audio work and overall presentation. However, the game was criticized for the lack of content in it at the time of release, although subsequent updates to the game have added new game modes and levels.

== Gameplay ==
A player surveys the beach landing at Anzio. This area acts as the insertion point for the Allied team.

Day of Defeat: Source is set in World War II, specifically the European Theatre in 1944. Players join the forces of either the United States Army or the German Wehrmacht and compete against each other in a variety of game modes. Players select from one of six classes to play as, each with its own role within the team. Player characters cannot afford to take much damage as in some circumstances they may be killed by a single bullet, forcing players to make use of cover to stay alive. When a player character dies, that player starts a short countdown for reinforcements. When the timer runs out, the player and any friendly players killed in that time respawn into the game at their insertion point as the next wave of troops. All weapons in the game have realistic limits to their use: machine guns must be deployed to maintain accurate fire or to be reloaded, rocket launchers must be shouldered to be aimed and fired, sniper rifles are most accurate when used with the scope and grenades not "cooked off" before release may be easily avoided or even thrown back by the opposition.

The game was initially released with four maps, although later updates have introduced five new levels and eight community produced maps supported by Valve. The game's levels are based after real battles in the Allied campaigns in Italy, Sicily and France, such as the Falaise pocket or the beach landings of Operation Shingle at Anzio, as well as fictional battles. Combat can take place in several environments, such as city streets, buildings and sewers. Each online game can sustain a maximum of 32 players.

Day of Defeat: Source, like other titles developed by Valve, tracks detailed statistics for individual players. They include the time spent playing as each class, accuracy and performance for each weapon used, flag captures, and various other details. Day of Defeat: Source features numerous "achievements" for carrying out certain tasks, such as scoring a certain number of kills with a particular weapon or completing a round within a certain time. Many of the achievements are class-specific, providing incentive for a player to improve his or her abilities with each class evenly. Achievements unlocked and statistics from previously played games are displayed on the player's Steam profile page.

=== Game modes ===
There are two main game modes in Day of Defeat: Source: territorial control and detonation. In territorial control maps, players must fight for control of all strategic points on the map. The strategic points take various forms, such as a destroyed tank in a street or fields and buildings, and are designated by a flag in its vicinity, which displays the army colors of the team who controls the point. Points are captured by a certain number of team members surrounding the point, with it either capturing instantly or after a couple of seconds. Players on the other side can disrupt a capture by placing themselves within the capture area during the process or by killing the enemy players at the point. The first side to hold all the points simultaneously wins the round.

The objective in a detonation level is to plant and detonate explosive devices on a number of enemy positions, which can consist of anti-aircraft guns, tanks and armored cars. Some positions must be hit twice for them to be destroyed. Players can protect their positions by defusing the explosives before they detonate. In one variation of this game mode, one side has to defend their positions for a set amount of time, with the destruction of each piece of equipment giving the enemy team more time. The defenders win if they can hold their positions long enough for the time to run out, while the attackers win when all objectives have been destroyed. In the alternate version, both teams must attack the other's objectives while defending their own. The first team to destroy all of the enemy's equipment wins.

=== Classes ===
A German rifleman takes aim. The destroyed train station in the background forms one of the game's strategic points.

Both factions in Day of Defeat: Source have access to six classes. Each class is designed with specific combat circumstances in mind, so that teams must use teamwork to succeed. The weapons and equipment carried by the classes are based on the weapons used by both the US Army and Wehrmacht during World War II. Some of classes are armed with pistols—the American M1911 or the German Walther P38—while others are equipped with trench knives or entrenching tools for melee combat. Grenades are carried by a number of classes, depending on their role in the game—riflemen are equipped with rifle grenades, the assault classes are armed with a single fragmentation grenade and a smoke grenade for providing concealment, while support classes have access to two standard fragmentation grenades.

== Development ==
=== Production ===
Day of Defeat: Source was first announced for Microsoft Windows during the development of Half-Life 2, the flagship game of the Source engine, as one of several of the Valve's GoldSrc powered games to be remade on the new game engine. In the aftermath of the release of Half-Life 2 and Counter-Strike: Source, very little information was released regarding the development of Day of Defeat: Source until 2005. In February 2005, Valve announced Day of Defeat: Source, stating that the game was nearing its beta development phase and would be available later in the first quarter of the year. The game was opened to an internal beta test soon after, which certain members of the Day of Defeat community were invited to join. The beta version of the game was shown as a straight conversion of the most recent version of Day of Defeat, at the time even including the same player and weapon models as the game's GoldSrc counterpart. Due to the response of the beta testers, significant changes were made to the gameplay, taking it away from being a straight conversion: the behaviour of weapons was altered and several classes from Day of Defeat were dropped entirely. Later media releases showed the revamped version of the game, including its new player and weapon models, as well as new additions to the game, such as rifle grenades and smoke grenades. On September 2, 2005, Valve announced that they were "confident" that the game would be released that month, and seven days later announced an official release date of September 26, 2005. The game was made available for preload via Valve's Steam content delivery system on September 14, 2005, and was officially released on time on September 26.

Day of Defeat: Source has undergone several updates. These updates have consisted of gameplay tweaks, maps and graphical effects. The first new level was released on November 30, 2005, and was followed on January 25, 2006, by another map, used as a demonstration for the Source engine's abilities in rendering snow and ice. A major update was announced on June 22, 2006, adding the detonation game mode, various gameplay tweaks and two further maps to accommodate the new game mode. The update was released on June 28, 2006. On April 26, 2007, a group of maps produced by the game's community, entitled the Community Assembled Map Pack (CAMP1), was released. Consisting of three maps, the pack was created with the assistance and support of Valve. This was followed by CAMP2 on July 26, 2007, a pack which consisted of a further five maps. On May 23, 2008, Valve announced another major update to Day of Defeat: Source, this time giving the game support for the company's new Steamworks programmer. The update is open to any owners of Day of Defeat: Source. Along with various gameplay tweaks, the update moves the game to the Source engine version used with The Orange Box, allowing the game to utilize particle effects, as well as adding a map based on a long-standing custom map for Day of Defeat and 54 achievement awards for players completing certain tasks.

=== Technology ===
Depth of field, color correction and film grain effects used in the trailer

Day of Defeat: Source has been used by Valve as a platform for demonstrating several technologies in the Source engine. Day of Defeat: Source introduced a dynamic audio system that was limited to non-player characters in Half-Life 2. The sound of each weapon firing in-game is attributed with distance and occlusion variables, which are processed and then fed back to the player. Sounds far from the player lack higher frequencies and thus sound more like they naturally would, allowing for the actions of other players on a map to make up the ambient sounds for the level. The game was the first to incorporate Valve's high dynamic range rendering, predating the official demonstration, Half-Life 2: Lost Coast. Other effects were added post-release to make the game appear as if it were a World War II era film. The effects include motion blur, depth of field, film grain and color correction. Phong shading on the Source engine was added to Day of Defeat: Source with the major update in the second quarter of 2006.

=== Marketing ===
To promote the game, Valve has produced three machinima trailers depicting the game in play. The trailers are themed around wartime propaganda news reports for both Germany and the United States. To convey this effect, the trailers make extensive usage of the Source engine's capabilities for film grain, color correction, motion blur and depth of field, as well as sepia toning. The first trailer was released as part of the game's post-release marketing on December 20, 2005. Entitled Prelude to Victory, the trailer depicted a large firefight in the game as a report from the German perspective, complete with a commentator speaking in the German language. Two further trailers were released to promote the major update to Day of Defeat: Source in the second quarter of 2006. The trailers, both from the American viewpoint, displayed how the new detonation gameplay worked, emphasising teamwork as the key to success, as well as introducing the viewer to the two new maps added by the update. To further create interest in the game, Valve has opened Day of Defeat: Source to three free weekends, the first taking place on February 10, 2006, the second on July 8, 2006 and the third on July 4, 2008, where anyone with a Steam account could download and play the game for a maximum of 48 hours free of charge.

== Reception ==
Reception

Aggregate scores
Aggregator	Score
GameRankings	81%
Metacritic	80/100

Review scores
Publication	Score
1Up.com	B−
GameSpot	8.1/10
GameSpy	3.5/5
IGN	8.4/10
PC Gamer (UK)	86%
PC Zone	7.9/10

Day of Defeat: Source was given a positive reception, receiving ratings of 80/100 and 81% from the review aggregation sites Metacritic and GameRankings. The game's graphics received praise, with GameSpot stating that "presentation is Day of Defeat: Source's most obvious strength", and PC Zone citing this for creating a "tense and atmospheric" game. The ragdoll physics in the game noted by reviewers as being "amusing", and the game's audio work was also praised. The core gameplay, described as "lightning war meets capture the flag" by 1UP.com, was equally praised by reviewers, many appreciating the interdependence of the classes and strategic gameplay. Several reviews closed remarking that the game's content was of a very high quality.

Criticism of the game principally revolved around the lack of content. While praise was bestowed upon the quality of the content already available, a number of reviewers were concerned about the small number of maps included in the initial release, even though new content was promised by Valve for later. IGN commented that the existing content had a good chance of going "stale", while GameSpy stated that the game's "lack of breadth" was a "serious shortcoming". In addition, PC Zone commented that "by still clinging to the small-scale skirmish atmosphere of the original, Day of Defeat: Source doesn't make much of departure from Counter-Strike", stating that this made the game seem like a "facelift" to a "much-loved mod [...] before making us pay for it again". PC Zone summed its review up by commenting that "this is an old game—an excellent old game and a beautiful old game—but an old game nonetheless".
