= Nude mod =

Pornographic video game mod

A nude mod is a video game mod created for the sole purpose of depicting characters with partial or full nudity in a non-erotic game. Nude mods are ubiquitous and heavily popular in gaming, as almost no non-erotic games allow the depiction of fully-nude characters for fear of being labeled pornography, limiting their potential audience and possibly causing them to be blocked from sale either physically or online. They are often created mere days after a game's release. In certain cases, such as with eroge, nude mods can be purposely created and distributed by developers to avoid censorship by restoring the full content to an "all-ages" version of the game.

Some nude mods only remove a character's undergarments, allowing the nudity to temporarily be visible, while others simply remove any clothing or other nudity-blocking elements of their design. Nude mods usually skew towards a male audience, and are often controversial with game developers and some fans, though other developers take a laissez-faire attitude or even support their creation.

== History ==
One of the first and most infamous nude mods was Nude Raider, which removed the clothes of Lara Croft from the 1996 game Tomb Raider when applied to it. This caused the game's developers, Core Design, to attempt to shut down any sites hosting nude images of the character using cease and desists, fearing its effect on young players. Other game series such as Dead or Alive, The Sims, Fallout and Street Fighter subsequently received nude mods.

Characters most likely to receive nude mods are attractive female protagonists - besides Croft, 2B from Nier: Automata and Eve from Stellar Blade have received a notably large number of adult mods. Male nude mods also exist; for example, a Sekiro: Shadows Die Twice nude mod allows the player to play as a nude Sekiro, Emma or Genichiro, though male genitalia were not rendered as part of the mod.

In the 2010s, it became increasingly common for eroge developers to share instructions to install uncensored patches of their games due to the content restrictions of the Steam store against nudity and other adult content. In 2017, game studios Dharker Studio and Lupiesoft noted that Steam had begun to also ban this practice, forcing developers to only mention these patches on their official sites. A fan backlash against Steam's heavy and inconsistent censorship led to a complete halt of adult game releases on Steam as Valve Corporation developed tools allowing users to choose whether to see such games on the store, followed by the allowance of content that is not "illegal or straight-up trolling", with the eroge Negligee: Love Stories being the first game allowed on the platform with uncensored sexual interactions and nudity.

== Reception ==
Many developers oppose nude mods on the basis that they negatively impact the image of the game, characters, or studio itself by making the public equate it with pornography. In 2002, Koei Tecmo won a court case over a modded Dead or Alive 2 skin that rendered the character Kasumi naked, claiming it was a violation of their copyright. The same studio sued a man in 2021 for selling a DVD containing footage of a modded version of Dead or Alive Xtreme Venus Vacation with nude characters online. Despite warning players against making such mods for Dead or Alive 5 and urging them to be "good and moral", the mods were created anyway by the modder "Vergil", who found the statement humorous due to the games' generally risque content regardless, believing it may have been a publicity stunt. He noted that since his mods required some expensive game DLC to work, they would increase Koei Tecmo's profits.

Hajime Tabata, director of the 2016 game Final Fantasy XV, responded to the possibility of nude mods being created when Square Enix decided to add modding support for the game. He stated that while key members of the company were concerned about the impact of these mods on the game's perception, they decided that they would not try to go after them, but said that modding support for future Final Fantasy games was dependent on whether players take things "too far" with them, urging players to be "as controlled as possible".

Nude mods have generally been criticized by game journalists as immoral, though others have simply been perplexed at their existence. Joshua Wolens of PC Gamer described their users as "gooners" who are "inured to sexuality" and questioning "what kind of lifestyle it is that leads a person to turn a videogame main menu into hardcore pornography", though he acknowledged their popularity, noting that the top 10 mods for Stellar Blade were all adult in nature and had been "downloaded about a quarter of a million times collectively".

In rare cases, developers and critics have expressed support for such mods. In 2015, Emanuel Maiberg of VICE expressed surprise that Fallout 4 nude mods appeared only a single day after release, but, noting they only included female characters, jokingly asked modders to "please step it up and allow me to play as a naked dude". In 2017, a nude mod of 2B raised brief controversy when it was unclear if it was the official model of the character. Yoko Taro, creator of the character and director of the Drakengard and Nier series, was intrigued and asked fans to send him pictures.
