= Counter-Strike Neo =

2003 tactical first-person shooter arcade game

Counter-Strike: Neo
- Developer: Namco
- Publisher: Namco
- Series: Counter-Strike
- Engine: GoldSrc
- Platforms: Arcade, Namco System N2
- Release: 11 June, 2003
- Genre: Tactical arcade first-person shooter
- Modes: Single-player, Multi-player

Counter-Strike: Neo (Japanese: カウンターストライク ネオ) is a 2003 tactical first-person shooter arcade game developed and published by Namco. Released exclusively in Japan for Linux-based arcade hardware, it is an arcade adaptation of the 2000 multiplayer game Counter-Strike, itself a modification of Half-Life.

== Gameplay ==
Counter-Strike Neo retains the team-based tactical gameplay of Counter-Strike, while adapting the game for Japanese arcade audiences. The game features simplified controls and settings compared to the PC version.

The game featured two matchmaking systems: Mercenary Mode and Squad Mode. Mercenary Mode provided a more casual matchmaking experience with bots and automatically assigned servers based on the player's experience, and ELO level. Squad Mode offered a more competitive alternative, featuring 5v5 matchmaking catered more towards clan gameplay.

In addition to the multiplayer matches, the game included single-player missions and mini-games that rewarded players with unique rewards.

== Development and release ==
Namco developed Counter-Strike Neo as part of an effort to expand online arcade gaming in Japan during the early 2000s, inspired by the success of competitive gaming in the United States. The game reworked elements of the original Counter-Strike, replacing the terrorist and counter-terrorist factions with fictional futuristic organisations.

Beta-testing for the game began in May 2003 at LED ZONE in Kamata, Tokyo.

In 2005, Namco released a major update to the game, commonly referred to as "Counter-Strike Neo Ver.2". The update marked the end of the game's open testing period and expanded distribution to additional arcades across Japan. Around the same time, Namco released Counter-Strike Neo: White Memories, a promotional visual novel based on the game.

Online services for Counter-Strike Neo were discontinued on February 1, 2010, leaving local area network multiplayer as the primary remaining method of multiplayer play in arcades.

== Plot ==
Set in a futuristic cyberpunk-inspired world, a megacorporation known as NEO has risen to power through advancements in nanotechnology and seeks global dominance. In response, the United Nations forms the Cosmopolitan Special Forces (CSF), an international task force created to oppose NEO and restore global stability.
