= Day of Defeat =

2003 video game

- Developer: Valve
- Publisher: Activision
- Composer: Michael Gordon Shapiro
- Engine: GoldSrc
- Platforms: Windows, OS X, Linux
- Release: May 1, 2003: Windows; WW: May 1, 2003; OS X, Linux; WW: March 29, 2013
- Genre: First-person shooter
- Mode: Multiplayer

Day of Defeat is a class-based multiplayer first-person shooter video game set in the European theatre of World War II on the Western front. Originally a modification of the 1998 game Half-Life, the rights of the modification were purchased by Valve and released as a full retail title in 2003.

Set in the midst of World War II, Day of Defeat includes no single-player campaign, with focus left only on the game's multiplayer aspects. The game favors teamwork and features objective-based gameplay in combination with its system of classes. Maps are primarily made up of narrow paths, all of which typically lead to a few key locations. An official remake of the game, Day of Defeat: Source, was released by Valve in 2005.

== Gameplay ==
Day of Defeat is a multiplayer first-person shooter that simulates squad-level infantry combat between the adversaries of World War II's European Theatre; the Allies and the Axis powers. Players can choose to join either the Allied or Axis armies, with the Allies including the United States or Great Britain and the Axis including Germany.

A round begins with two opposing teams starting simultaneously in their respective spawn area of a map, both acting towards the goal of achieving their respective objectives whilst preventing the enemy team from accomplishing theirs. A round ends when one team accomplishes all of its objectives, with that team claiming victory. Eventually, the game ends with the expiration of a set time limit, and the team with the most objectives achieved is the winning team regardless of kills or casualties, except in the case of both teams having not achieved any objectives or having achieved the same number of objectives.

Weaponry in the game attempts to realistically portray those that would be found in World War II, and the gameplay reflects this aesthetic choice. Recoil can be heavy and the game does not allow the player to fire while running or jumping. The game also features a stamina bar, preventing the player from sprinting for long periods of time and forcing them to actively conserve energy.

== Setting ==
A player takes cover behind rubble in order to avoid enemy fire.

Day of Defeat's initial retail offering included fifteen maps, each depicting different scenarios with variation in size and thematic locations. These often drew inspiration from historical World War II battles, such as the battle at Omaha Beach and street-fighting in the Italian city of Salerno during Operation Avalanche. The game also features a Glider mission wherein the American 101st Airborne lands in a WACO Glider and destroys such objectives as a radio antenna and Flak 88 mm gun anti-aircraft gun.

Weapons in the game are also of historical significance, with much of the weaponry being accurate representations of those used in World War II. The weapon selection is also realistic in its usage, with recoil and accuracy representative of the gun's real-life counterparts.

== Development ==
Day of Defeat began development as a third-party Half-Life modification in 1999. In 2000, the mod’s development team started releasing closed alpha versions, eventually releasing Beta 1.0, the first public version, in January 2001. In the initial release of the modification, it included only four player classes: Light Infantry, Assault Infantry, Sniper, and Heavy Weapons, with each class having unique movement characteristics. This difference, however, was removed with the release of Beta 2.0 in February 2002. Beta 2.0 also introduced a new recoil and aiming system, significantly reduced accuracy while moving, added new weapons and machine gun classes with deployable bipods, and introduced prone and sprinting mechanics, resulting in major changes to the gameplay. In July 2002, Beta 3.0 was released with a new classes based around paratrooper maps, in which players would only respawn upon the beginning of a new round.

While the first versions of Day of Defeat were distributed over the internet at no cost, the rights to the game were later purchased by Valve and the modding team hired. Valve then produced a stand-alone retail version of the game, published by Activision and released in May 2003. The retail version included a number of changes from the modification, including the addition of British Army, improved graphics and fifteen maps, nine of which were completely new. Friendly-fire, which was previously enabled by default, was disabled in the retail version, bleeding - losing small amounts of health over time caused by injuries which "bled" - was removed, and a mini-map was added to more easily facilitate navigation and cooperation between fellow team members. UI improvements, including identifiers for differentiating team members from enemies and help messages that acted as a tutorial for new players, were also introduced in the retail release.

At the end of July 2004, Valve shut down its WON authentication servers in favor of their digital distribution service Steam. All of Valve's games using the service were migrated to Steam, forcing players to use the new platform to access Day of Defeat. WON itself continued operating under Sierra/Activision until November 2008. In 2013, Valve released an update for Day of Defeat, alongside other GoldSrc games developed by Valve, which included versions of the game for Mac OS X and Linux.

== Reception ==
Reception

Aggregate score
Aggregator	Score
Metacritic	79/100

Review scores
Publication	Score
Computer Gaming World	4/5
Game Informer	8.5/10
GameSpot	8.1/10
GameSpy	3/5
GameZone	9/10
IGN	8/10
PC Format	70%
PC Gamer (UK)	84%
PC Gamer (US)	84%
X-Play	2/5

Day of Defeat received "generally favorable reviews" according to the review aggregation website Metacritic. IGN praised the game for its use of narrow spaces to stimulate the game's "relentless pacing", and GameSpy spoke highly of its attention to detail. Reviewers also praised Day of Defeat for its promotion of teamwork through purposefully tight corridors that force players to cooperate, lest they be killed by an enemy outside their field of vision.

Both GameSpy and GameSpot levied criticism against the game for its sub-par visuals and "downright ugly" color palette, blaming the aging GoldSrc engine for the aesthetic issues. Many reviewers drew parallels between Day of Defeat and Battlefield 1942, the latter of which had been released only six months prior to the former. Both games were set in World War II and featured gameplay that was heavily reliant on their respective class-based systems, which lead reviewers to make direct comparisons between the two in their reviews of Day of Defeat. The game was also faulted for its lack of usable vehicles, contrasting Battlefield's usage of operable vehicles as a key gameplay component.

PC Gamer US awarded Day of Defeat its 2001 "Mod of the Year" prize. The editors wrote, "Made by amateur developers not yet of American drinking age, Day of Defeat absorbed entire weeks of office LAN play."

=== Legacy ===
Day of Defeat was followed by Day of Defeat: Source, a remake of the game that runs on Valve's Source engine. The Source remake included significant changes to Day of Defeat's gameplay, new maps, updated graphics, and improved physics.

Released on September 26, 2005 to favorable reviews, the game was praised for its gameplay, audio, and graphics. Post-release, the game was supported by Valve with a number of subsequent updates, including versions of the game for OS X and Linux released in 2010 and 2013 respectively.

== See also ==
- List of video games derived from modifications
- Day of Infamy (video game)
