= The Nier: Automata Church =

2022 video game mod and hoax

- The character 9S seen entering the church, as depicted in the mod
- Developers: DevolasRevenge, Woeful_Wolf, RaiderB
- Platform: Windows
- Release: September 6, 2022
- Genre: Gameplay mod
- Mode: Single-player

The Nier: Automata Church (stylized as The NieR: Automata Church) is a mod for the Windows version of Nier: Automata developed by the trio of DevolasRevenge, Woeful_Wolf and RaiderB, and released on September 6, 2022. The mod adds a secret church area to the game, accessible from its Copied City area via a hidden door, featuring references to the series.

It gained notoriety due to its initial reveal on Reddit, where it was presented as a possible Easter egg left in the game by director Yoko Taro by a confused player who accidentally unlocked it. This claim was made more believable by Yoko's history of adding Easter eggs to his games, including Automata itself, and the fact that it was supposedly impossible to mod the game at that point, with the game's producer and Yoko himself both cryptically acknowledging and encouraging the hoax. This led to a large collaborative effort by the game's fans to find the conditions to trigger it. The hoax was eventually revealed on July 29, 2022, via a Twitch stream held by its creators, who then released the modding tools they used to develop it.

The mod was described by journalists as an impressive technical feat, while the process it was revealed was characterized as a gripping mystery and one of the most major video game hoaxes. The ensuing "church saga" was noted as extending outside the video game realm and involving non-fans in the detective work.

== Hoax ==
The hoax originated in a "cryptic post" left on Reddit by user "sadfutago" on June 15, 2022, who asked how to open a church in Nier: Automata, claiming their friend could not open it. However, the area was never before seen and inaccessible to other players. The user continued to follow up with more pictures and videos of the secret area, with one Redditor calling it a "god tier and impressive hoax" if it was fake. The mod's viral popularity increased when Nier: Automata producer Yosuke Saito and creator Yoko Taro retweeted videos of it, with Saito calling it an "eternal mystery". Fans ultimately asked Yoko Taro on Twitter to clarify whether he had secretly added it to the game, something made more believable by the fact that a "hyperspecific" cheat code had previously been discovered in 2021 that was later officially confirmed. However, Yoko refused to comment, pointing fans to his policy of directing any questions about his games to his publisher.

The fan community made "extensive" efforts to discover how to unlock it, with the efforts being chronicled on Twitter by Vera, a Nier fan. "Bloby", an enemy composed of a dark mass that could be battled within the church, became an "icon" to fans. Many fans believed it might have been an alternate reality game. However, on July 29, 2022, the mod's creators held a Twitch stream where they revealed that it was developed by fans. They also apologized to the community for misleading people, stating that they did not intend to give the impression the church was an ARG or that they wanted to impersonate Yoko Taro. Nevertheless, the hoax was called a net positive for the game and its fans, as it gained the attention of numerous people from outside the community.

== Gameplay ==
The mod is accessed from a hidden door in the wall of the game's Copied City area. Once the door is discovered, the player descends a long ladder, then advances through a long, twisting hallway before arriving within a church made of the same stone material as the city itself. The church contains a child turned to stone on an altar with a single Lunar Tear growing from their chest, and flanked by the weapons of characters Devola and Popola, with a mysterious dark mass nearby that cannot be interacted with. If visited by the character 9S, it is possible to hack into a chest contained within the church, revealing the health records for the character Yonah as shown in a later point in the main game. After hacking the chest, the player is suddenly engaged in battle by the black mass. Upon defeating it, the player can interact with a bird bath akin to one outside the Shadowlord's Castle in Nier, which asks the player questions in Japanese such as "why did humans disappear from the world?" If they are answered incorrectly, the player is kicked out of the church and returned to the beginning of the long hallway.

== Development ==
According to DevolasRevenge, he and the mod's other creators initially came up with the idea to create the Church mod as a way to troll the modding server, though it later evolved into a more complex endeavor. In January 2022, Devolas met Woeful_Wolf on the Nier modding Discord server, where he decided to look up modding tools and realized that it possessed a nearly complete, yet unreleased map modding program developed by Woeful, who had formerly created maps for Age of Empires, as well as the Fallout games and Skyrim. Woeful began developing the tool after believing the Lunar Tear cosmetic item was too low-resolution and wanting to improve the model. Devolas proposed adding a "mini-church" to demonstrate the tools prior to release.

They subsequently joined up with RaiderB, who had received access to the tools before Devolas. A fellow modder who was planning to remove all invisible walls from the game, he was eventually told the secret because the other team members felt sorry he had been left out, and ended up assisting with the mod's creation. The initial video posted by the team of the Church mod did not immediately go viral, and "died for a month" before being tweeted by Lance McDonald, a well-known PS4 modding personality and data miner who confirmed it was as yet impossible to mod the game in such a way. The viral fame, further assisted by the acknowledgement of the game's producer and creator, made the team "giddy" and inspiring them to keep working on it.

The team described the in-game church as surprisingly challenging to make, saying the engine was difficult to work with and never "played along". They called some things PlatinumGames had done in the internal files "bizarre". The team came under more intense pressure when the mod gained large amounts of attention. They put together new content "on the fly", knowing that the hoax could be ended with one mistake. Eventually, they began drip-feeding information, including posts by sadfutago spelling out "ZE34 Zinnia" as a hint, before ultimately revealing the truth about the mod.

== Reception ==
Upon the revelation of the hoax's existence, Joe Skrebels of IGN called the mod beautiful and impressive, remarking that the revelation the game could be modded was "huge news" for the community and that it "[blew] the modding scene wide open", also citing that fans saw it as a new future for the series. When the mod was finally released for fans to play themselves, Ryan Leston of the same publication remarked that the team had created a "sensational mystery", echoing the praise for the mod while also noting that it opened up new possibilities for Nier modding in the future, and remarking that more extensive projects were possible utilizing the tools used to develop the church.

Jenny Zheng of Rock Paper Shotgun called the mod's resolution "eerily similar" to the true ending of Nier: Automata, where players could choose to work together, describing the result as both incredible and harmonious. Mollie Taylor of PC Gamer called the efforts to discover the truth behind the mod a "joy to witness", saying it was a "damn good week to be a Nier fan" and wondering what else the modding team had planned, while Dustin Bailey of GamesRadar+ characterized the modding tools the team had created as "impressive" and "unprecedented".
