= Black Widow Games =

Video game developer

- Type: Private
- Industry: Video game development
- Founded: 1997
- Key people: Neil Manke, Einar Saukas, Magnus Jansén
- Products: They Hunger series, USS Darkstar, Soldier of Fortune (mod)

Black Widow Games was a video game developer specializing in promotional mods for Quake and Half-Life 3D engines. They are best known for their They Hunger series. Prominent members included Neil Manke (game and level design), Einar Saukas (game design and coding), and Magnus Jansén (game consultant and sound engineer). The company business model is based on developing contract-work mods for the marketing campaigns of customer companies and products (such as the S.O.F. TV series from Rysher Entertainment and the movie Underworld from Sony Pictures), freely distributed for promotion.

== History ==
Founded in 1997 to produce contractual mods for state of the art 3D game engines, Black Widow Games would release 14 games between their first mod, Soldier Of Fortune (created for Rysher Entertainment), and 2003. Notable releases included the Half Life spin-off, USS Darkstar (produced for PC Gamer), and the They Hunger series (produced for PC Gamer). They Hunger in particular generated extensive player discussion and was considered an example of good gameplay within the realm of Half-Life mods. To promote the 2003 film Underworld, Sony Pictures commissioned Black Widow Games a promotional tie-in mod titled Underworld: Bloodline. The mod was available on Sony Pictures' official website until the end of 2007 and remains the only officially licensed Half-Life mod tied to a Hollywood film.

In October 2005, the company declared it was not possible anymore to produce full-fledged single player mods working on low budget promotional projects within reduced development cycles, because of the higher level of detail required for modern 3D engines. At this time, the company revealed it had been secretly developing for almost a year its first commercial game They Hunger: Lost Souls, based on the Half-Life 2 Source engine, a successor to their popular Half-Life survival horror mod, They Hunger, which Black Widow Software had created in 1999 and released as a bonus with copies of the PC Gamer magazine. It would feature a plotline revolving around a zombie outbreak in northeastern Europe in the 1960s. Apart from a detailed plotline and a few developers' screenshots, however, little information has been released about the game since 2005. Sparse updates have been published over the years at the company's official website and in a few specialized game magazines, and the final product is expected to be released via Steam. Drawing some comparisons to vaporware titles, Planet Half-Life announced (as a joke) on April 1, 2007 that They Hunger: Lost Souls had again been redesigned and was set for release as a Nintendo DS game.

In November 2008, the developers of the Sven Co-op mod announced that they had been working with Black Widow Games to develop a co-op version of They Hunger, which was later released as an addon to be played in the mod in December 2008.

== Releases ==
=== Mods ===
- Jan. 1997: Dark Night (Quake multiplayer mod)
- Feb. 1997: Outpost (Quake multiplayer mod)
- Mar. 1997: Monastery (Quake multiplayer mod)
- Apr. 1997: SlaughterHouse (Quake multiplayer mod)
- Jul. 1997: Alba 1 (Quake multiplayer mod)
- Jul. 1997: Alba 2 (Quake multiplayer mod)
- Aug. 1997: Starship (Quake multiplayer mod)
- Nov. 1997: Starship II (Quake multiplayer mod)
- 1997: Silhouette Of Darkness (Quake multiplayer mod)
- Special Ops Force: Deathmatch (Quake II multiplayer mod)
- SlaughterShip (Quake II single player mod)
- 1999: They Hunger (Half-Life single player mod, later updated and re-released for PC Gamer in Feb. 2000)
- They Hunger Deathmatch 1-5 (Half-Life multiplayer mods)
- 2003: Abandoned Factory (Half-Life multiplayer mod)

=== Contract-work mods ===
- Oct. 1997: Soldier of Fortune (Quake single player mod for Rysher Entertainment based on the television series Soldier of Fortune, Inc.)
- Dec. 1997: Soldier of Fortune: Deathmatch (Quake multiplayer mod for Rysher Entertainment)
- Apr. 1998: Soldier of Fortune: Mission 2 (Quake II single player mod for Rysher Entertainment)
- Jul. 1998: Coconut Monkey: Paradise Lost (Quake II single player mod for PC Gamer)
- Sep. 1998: Special Ops Force: Mission 3 -- Desert Bloom (Quake II single player mod for Rysher Entertainment serving as a continuation of the Soldier of Fortune series upon the renaming of the original series by Rysher)
- Oct. 1998: Coconut Monkey: Dry Gulch (Quake II single player mod for PC Gamer)
- Dec. 1998: Special Ops Force: Mission 4 -- Cold as Ice (Quake II single player mod for Rysher Entertainment)
- Jan. 1999: Coconut Monkey: Saving Private Monkey (Quake II single player mod for PC Gamer)
- Aug. 1999: USS Darkstar (Half-Life single player mod for PC Gamer)
- Sep. 2000: They Hunger 2: Rest in Pieces (Half-Life single player mod for PC Gamer)
- Nov. 2000: Vidar's Niflheim (Half-Life multiplayer TFC map for CNET Gamecenter [later updated to Vidar's Niflheim 2])
- Jun. 2001: They Hunger 3: Rude Awakening (Half-Life single player mod for PC Gamer)
- Sep. 2003: Underworld: Bloodline (Half-Life multiplayer mod for Sony Pictures and Big Spaceship LLC based on the Underworld film series)

=== Skin work ===
- Female Player Model for Counter-Strike (Half-Life multiplayer CS model)
- HK G36 Model (Half-Life multiplayer CS model)
- HK PDW Model (Half-Life multiplayer CS model)
- M16 w M203 Model (Half-Life multiplayer CS model)
- M82A1 Barrett .50 cal Model (Half-Life multiplayer CS model)
- They Hunger Multiplayer Models Pack (Half-Life multiplayer They Hunger models)
