= Gunman Chronicles =

2000 video game

- The US box art for Gunman Chronicles. European variations mimicked the style of Half-Life's box art.
- Developer: Rewolf Software
- Publisher: Sierra Studios
- Director: Herbert Flower
- Producer: Jeff Pobst
- Designer: Stefan Baier
- Programmer: Brian Legge
- Artists: Renier Banninga; Mary Allred; Miriam Howes
- Composers: Anthony Brown; Chris Liesch
- Engine: GoldSrc
- Platform: Microsoft Windows
- Release: NA: November 21, 2000; EU: December 8, 2000
- Genre: First-person shooter
- Modes: Single-player, multiplayer

Gunman Chronicles (Note: Or Half-Life: Gunman (previously Gunman: TC and simply Gunman)) is a 2000 first-person shooter game originally created as a mod by the now-defunct Rewolf Software. It was originally a Quake deathmatch mod named Gunmanship 101, then it was moved to Quake II's engine before becoming a Half-Life mod. Gunman Chronicles was popular at the Half-Life Mod Expo in 1999, and Sierra approached Rewolf to make a retail version. After significant work, it was released as a standalone game. Plans were drawn to release Gunman Chronicles on GameCube, but it was never released.

== Gameplay ==
Gunman Chronicles is a first-person shooter that requires the player to perform combat tasks and puzzle solving to advance through the game, much like its predecessor Half-Life. While gameplay is similar to Half-Life's in terms of health-and-armor systems and artificial intelligence, one major aspect of Gunman Chronicles is the ability to customize each weapon. Each weapon the player obtains has multiple alternate "modes" for various situations; for instance, the starting pistol can be turned into a sniper rifle or a rapid-fire machine-pistol while the MULE, a rocket launcher, can be configured to fire homing rockets, timed explosives, or cluster bombs. Another new aspect of Gunman Chronicles is the ability to drive vehicles. During the latter half of the game, there is a lengthy vehicle section in which the player is able to drive a tank through a system of canyons. The player occasionally comes across obstacles hindering the tank's path which will require the player to stop and figure out a puzzle or activate a switch.

The game features a wide variety of enemies, including rogue Gunmen-turned-bandits, giant dinosaurs, genetically-modified aliens called Xenomes, and robotic attack drones. Bandits will roll around to dodge fire while returning fire with dual pistols or rifles, while Xenomes will charge at the player in packs with reckless abandon and release homing projectiles upon death. Similar to Half-Life, certain objects such as vases and crates can be destroyed to provide ammunition, health, and armor. Unlike Half-Life however, armor takes the form of actual vests, and can not be replenished by chargers like health can. Unlike Half-Life and its expansions, Gunman Chronicles, however sparsely, uses cutscenes to tell key parts of the storyline. These usually appear only as transitions between different worlds and levels however, and thus most of the plot is seen through the eyes of the player like in Half-Life.

== Synopsis ==
=== Setting ===
According to the game's introductory cutscene, the Gunmen act as a sort of military police force for humanity's inter-galactically expanding colonial empire at an unknown time period in the distant future. During a mission five years prior to the beginning of the game, the Gunmen were dispatched to a planet called Banzure Prime to investigate a communications breakdown with a research colony there, under the command of their leader, known simply as "The General". While investigating the colony, they come under attack by massive, worm-like organisms that form one part of a larger genus of creatures known as "Xenomes". The General, seeing his men have no chance by themselves, takes command of one of the Gunmen's dropships and begins performing bombing runs on the attacking Xenomes, destroying several before being captured in the jaws of one of the larger creatures. Meanwhile, the player character, Major Archer, rallies the remaining gunmen and orders them to retreat to the remaining ships and get off-world immediately, assuming that the general is already dead. The General, still alive as his fighter is dragged underground, pleads (apparently unheard) for rescue over the radio, but the Gunmen leave before having a chance to receive the message.

=== Plot ===
Five years later, the game places the player in direct control of Major Archer, preparing for a mission aboard the Gunman space station Aeronautica. After a training level, Archer and a small detachment of Gunmen are deployed to a dinosaur-inhabited jungle planet, under orders to investigate an outdated but extremely high ranking Gunman distress signal. The signal is revealed to be a trap, and the Gunmen come under heavy attack both from unidentified human forces and the indigenous fauna. The player is eventually forced to fight his way through a series of catacombs, where he encounters the General, still alive despite having been eaten alive on Banzure Prime. He reveals to Archer that the silicon-based Xenomes are incapable of digesting carbon-based humans, and that he, the scientists from the research colony, and the other Gunmen consumed by the Xenomes managed to fight their way out of the creature's gullets after Archer left them for dead. The vengeful scientists and Gunmen have now formed a rogue cell, with the General as its leader, and are engineering new Xenome breeds to use as weapons and to exact their vengeance upon Archer. The General allows Archer to leave, so as to watch him die at the hands of the planet's vicious reptiles, but he manages to infiltrate the General's cargo ship, bound for a falling moon that plays host to an outdated AI, called the Mainframe, that has been unstable for some time since the General left it. At the moon, the ship comes under fire from the now fully insane AI's drones. The General dumps the cargo module Archer is hiding in to gain speed and leaves the AI facility's science team behind to die.

As Archer progresses through the facility, he learns that the Mainframe's primary battle is with a major Xenome infestation that the humans brought onto the moon. Fighting both attack drones and Xenomes alike, Archer makes his way through the facility. Despite the Mainframe's best efforts, Archer manages to destroy most of the "kata-space anchors" that keep the moon from falling to the planet below. Archer survives the destruction of the anchors, but is stranded on the falling moon. Archer eventually finds the Mainframe and they form an uneasy alliance: the Mainframe will provide an aerial drone for Major Archer to escape in, but only if he takes the Mainframe's core with him. Major Archer agrees, and they battle through hordes of Xenome forces with the help of the Mainframe's attack drones. Major Archer and the AI successfully reach and board the aerial drone, but fail to navigate through an asteroid field on their way into kata-space and crash land on a desert planet called Icnus, encountering and fighting rogue Gunmen. Icnus turns out to be the location of the General's main Xenome facility. Archer battles his way through the facility with the help of the Mainframe, accidentally causing a captured Worm Xenome, one of the most dangerous Xenomes in existence, to break loose.

The Mainframe helps Archer to the General's location and they engage in a firefight, where the AI's newly constructed Super Drone defeats the General's Kata-Drone. The General bails out but is immediately attacked by the escaped Worm Xenome, which comes out of a crevice and consumes him once again. The Mainframe states its intention to make the Xenome facility its home as it calls for backup, and Gunman reinforcements arrive shortly after to contain the Xenome infestation and capture any remaining rogue Gunmen.

== Rewolf Software ==
Rewolf Software logo

Rewolf Software, also known as Rewolf Entertainment, was a game development studio established in Utah by Herbert Flower (also known as Herb Flower) in 1996. The development team came from the mod scene and was put together for the duration of one project, which was Gunman Chronicles.

After Gunman Chronicles was shipped, Rewolf Entertainment dissolved and its team members moved on to new ventures. A couple of months later, in 2001, Herbert Flower co-founded Mythyn Interactive together with Paul Witte. The core team that worked on Gunman, consisting of Stefan Baier, Renier Banninga, and Adrian Banninga, moved to the Netherlands, where they co-founded Streamline Studios together with Alexander L. Fernandez.

== Reception ==
Reception

Aggregate score
Aggregator	Score
Metacritic	65/100

Review scores
Publication	Score
AllGame	2/5
CNET Gamecenter	6/10
Computer Games Strategy Plus	2/5
Computer Gaming World	3.5/5
EP Daily	8/10
Eurogamer	8/10
Game Informer	8.25/10
GameRevolution	C
GameSpot	5.8/10
GameSpy	80%
GameZone	7/10
IGN	7/10
Next Generation	2/5
PC Gamer (US)	52%

The game received mixed reviews according to the review aggregation website Metacritic. Jim Preston of NextGen called it "A respectable mod that's still no better than some of the free stuff out there." John Marrin of GamePro called it "a worthy title if you hanker for a reheated FPS experience. It's like day old meatloaf: still delicious, but still meatloaf." (Note: GamePro gave the game 4.5/5 for graphics, 4/5 for sound, 5/5 for control, and 3.5/5 for fun factor.)

== See also ==
- List of video games derived from modifications
