= Sony Ericsson W610i =

Mobile phone model

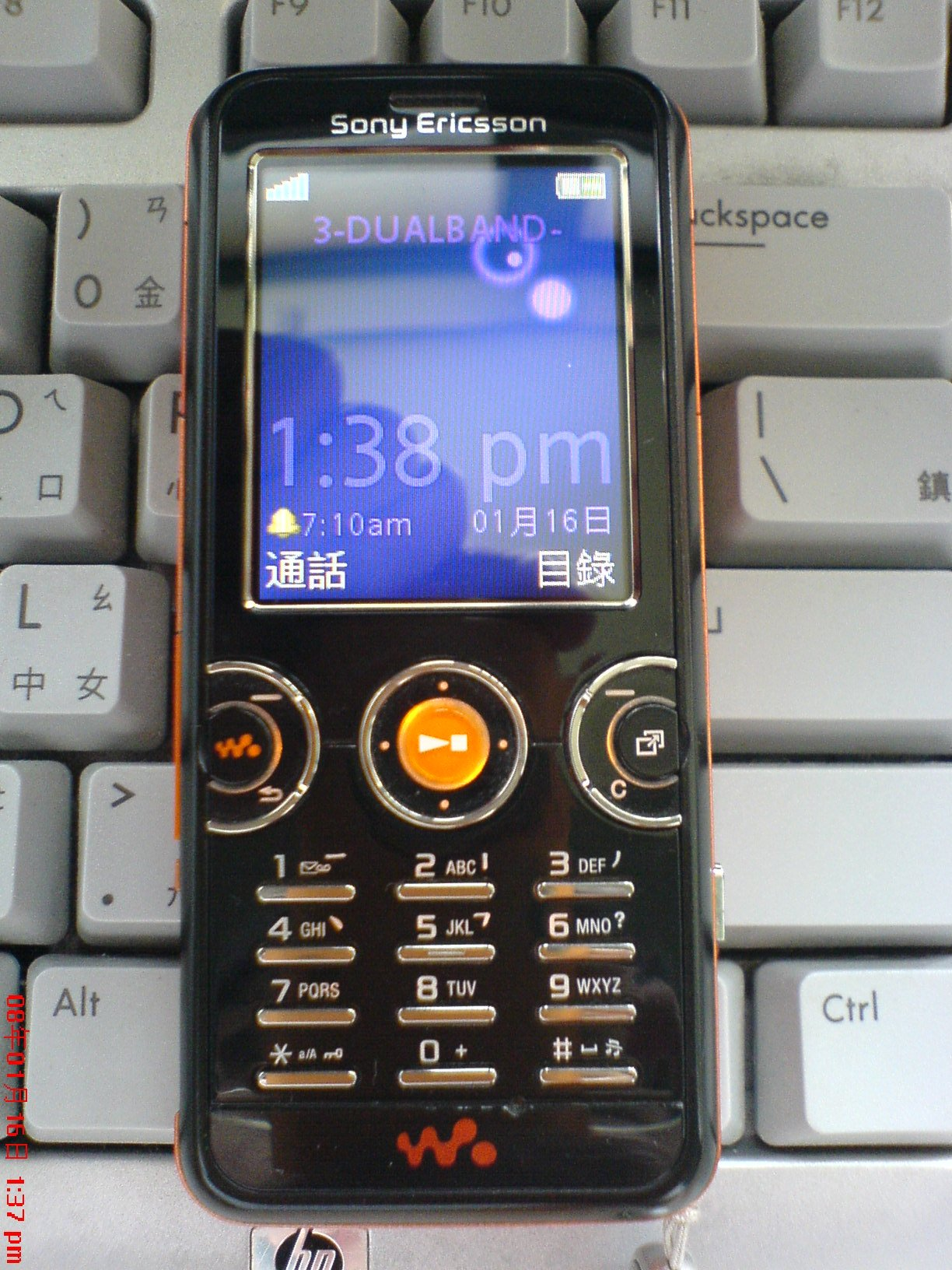
- First released: April 30, 2007
- Compatible networks: GSM 850/900/1800/1900 and EDGE
- Dimensions: 102×46×14 mm (4.02×1.81×0.55 in)
- Weight: 95 g (3 oz)
- Memory: Memory Stick Micro M2
- Display: 176x220 pixels (QCIF+), 262,144 (18-bit) color TFD LCD
- Connectivity: GPRS, Bluetooth, IrDA, USB 2.0

The Sony Ericsson W610i is a mobile phone based on the Sony Ericsson K550 and Sony Ericsson K610i. It is a quad-band GSM phone, but it does not offer 3G (UMTS or HSDPA). The W610i has colour options similar to the Sony Ericsson W880i. This phone uses the TrackID and version 2.0 of the Walkman player.

== Camera ==
The phone has a 2.0 megapixel camera, similar to that in the Sony Ericsson K550i but without the lens cover. As with previous Sony Ericsson models, it offers an auto-focus feature and uses a photo light instead of a flash. For this model, the focal length of the camera's lens has been reduced from 4.8mm to 3.8mm.

== Specifications ==
- Display: 262K TFD (176x220 pixels)
- Memory: Up to 64 MB user memory
- Size: 102 x 46 x 14 mm
- Weight: 93 grams
- Colour: Plush Orange, Satin Black
- SAR: 1.31 W/kg (10g)
- Battery: BST-33 (950mAh)

== Features ==
Music

- Walkman player 2.0
- Supports MP3, AAC, AAC+, E-AAC+, WAV and m4a
- 512 MB Memory Stick included
- TrackID music recognition software
- Polyphonic ringtone, 72 channels
- Disc2Phone music management software
- Stereo headphones in the box
- FM radio with RDS
- Bluetooth stereo streaming support (A2DP)
- Java MIDP 2.0

Messaging

- TFT 1.96’’ Display
- SMS, MMS, e-mail and IM

Connectivity

- NetFront web browser
- RSS Reader
- Bluetooth 2.0 with A2DP
- Infrared port
- USB 2.0

Supported Networks

- GSM 850
- GSM 900
- GSM 1800
- GSM 1900
- HSCSD
- EDGE

== In popular game culture ==
- The black and orange model appears in Cry of Fear as Simon Henriksson's personal phone.

== See also ==
- List of Sony Ericsson products
