= GoldSrc =

Video game engine

- Official GoldSrc logo, depicting the Greek letter and scientific symbol, Lambda (λ)

- Screenshot from Half-Life
- Other names: GoldSource, Half-Life Engine
- Developers: Valve, id Software
- Release: November 19, 1998; 27 years ago
- Written in: C, C++, Assembly language
- Predecessor: Quake engine
- Successor: Source
- License: Proprietary

GoldSrc (pronounced "gold source", formerly the Half-Life Engine) is a proprietary game engine developed by Valve. At its core, GoldSrc is a heavily modified version of id Software's Quake engine. It made its debut in 1998 with Half-Life and powered future games developed by or with oversight from Valve, including Half-Life's expansions, Day of Defeat and games in the Counter-Strike series. GoldSrc was succeeded by the Source engine with the releases of Half-Life: Source, Half-Life 2, and Counter-Strike: Source in 2004.

== Development ==
The basis of GoldSrc is the engine used in the video game Quake, albeit with heavy modification by Valve. While the engine served as the basis for GoldSrc, Gabe Newell said that a majority of the code used in the engine was created by Valve. GoldSrc's artificial intelligence systems, for example, were essentially made from scratch. The engine also uses some code from other games in the Quake series, including QuakeWorld and Quake II.

In 1997, Valve hired Ben Morris and acquired Worldcraft, a tool for creating custom Quake maps. The tool was renamed Valve Hammer Editor and became the official mapping tool for GoldSrc. The engine supports skeletal animation, which allowed for more realistic body kinematics and facial expression animations than most other engines at the time of release.

The GoldSrc engine initially had no real name and was simply called the Half-Life engine. When the need arose for Valve to work on the engine without risking introducing bugs into Half-Life's codebase, Valve forked the code, creating two main engine branches: one gold master branch, "GoldSrc", and the other "Src". Internally, any games using the original branch were referred to as "Goldsource" to differentiate it from the second branch, while the "Src" branch evolved into the Source engine.

Valve released versions of the GoldSrc engine for OS X and Linux in 2013, eventually porting all of their first-party games using the engine to the platforms by the end of the year.

== History ==
=== Half-Life series ===
Half-Life was Valve's debut title and the first to use GoldSrc. It received critical acclaim, winning over fifty PC Game of the Year awards. The game was followed up with two expansions, Half-Life: Opposing Force and Half-Life: Blue Shift, both of which ran GoldSrc and were developed by Gearbox Software. Half-Life: Decay, an expansion pack for Half-Life only released on PlayStation 2, was released in 2001 alongside Half-Life's debut on the platform. Unlike other games in the series, it never received an official version for Windows, however an unofficial version of the game was released by independent developers in 2008. Half-Life: Decay was the final iteration in the Half-Life series to run on GoldSrc, with all future entries in the series using the Source and Source 2 engines.

=== Other Valve games ===
Valve developed several games using the GoldSrc engine, many of which were based on original user-made modifications. Valve's Team Fortress Classic, released in 1999, was developed primarily by two of the developers of the Quake mod Team Fortress. Counter-Strike and Day of Defeat were also originally Half-Life modifications that Valve purchased the rights to and re-released as standalone titles. Counter-Strike evolved into its own series with the debut of the Japanese arcade game Counter-Strike Neo in 2003 and Valve's own follow-up in 2004, Counter-Strike: Condition Zero, both of which run on the GoldSrc engine. Although Valve's further installments in the series starting with Counter-Strike: Source use the newer Source engine instead, Counter-Strike Online and Counter-Strike Nexon, two spinoff titles released by Nexon in 2008 and 2014 respectively, use GoldSrc as their basis.

=== Third-party games and modifications ===
The GoldSrc engine was also used for a variety of third-party games and modifications not directly developed by Valve. Rewolf Software used the engine for the game Gunman Chronicles in 2000, and the PC version of James Bond 007: Nightfire was developed by Gearbox Software using a modified version of GoldSrc in 2002.

Unofficial, community-made modifications of GoldSrc have also been produced. Notable games include Natural Selection, Cry of Fear and Sven Co-op, with Valve's Team Fortress Classic, Counter-Strike, and Day of Defeat all being based on GoldSrc mods of the same names. Sven Co-op have since been released for free as a standalone game on Steam, which use a licensed derivative of the engine with their own customizations.

The Xash3D project and forks use Quake engine source code in part, as well as the Half-Life SDK, to recreate GoldSrc and run its various mods on different platforms. The FreeHL and FreeCS ports also utilize QuakeWorld code as well as clean-room reverse engineering.

== Games using GoldSrc ==
Year	Title	Developer(s)	Publisher(s)
1998	Half-Life	Valve	Sierra Entertainment, Valve (digital)
1999	Half-Life: Opposing Force	Gearbox, Valve	Sierra Entertainment, Valve (digital)
1999	Team Fortress Classic	Valve	Valve, Sierra Entertainment (digital)
1999	Sven Co-op	Sven Co-op team	Sven Co-op team
2000	They Hunger	Black Widow Games	Black Widow Games
2000	Counter-Strike	Valve	Sierra Entertainment
2000	Gunman Chronicles	Rewolf Entertainment	Sierra Entertainment
2000	Ricochet	Valve	Valve
2001	Deathmatch Classic	Valve	Valve
2001	Half-Life: Blue Shift	Gearbox, Valve	Sierra Entertainment, Valve (digital)
2001	Half-Life: Decay	Gearbox	Sierra Entertainment
2002	James Bond 007: Nightfire	Eurocom, Gearbox	Electronic Arts
2003	Day of Defeat	Valve	Activision, Valve (digital)
2003	Counter-Strike Neo	Namco	Namco
2004	Counter-Strike: Condition Zero	Valve, Ritual Entertainment, Gearbox, Turtle Rock Studios	Sierra Entertainment, Valve (digital)
2008	Counter-Strike Online	Valve, Nexon	Nexon
2012	Cry of Fear	Team Psykskallar	Team Psykskallar
2014	Counter-Strike Nexon	Valve, Nexon	Nexon
