= Floor model =

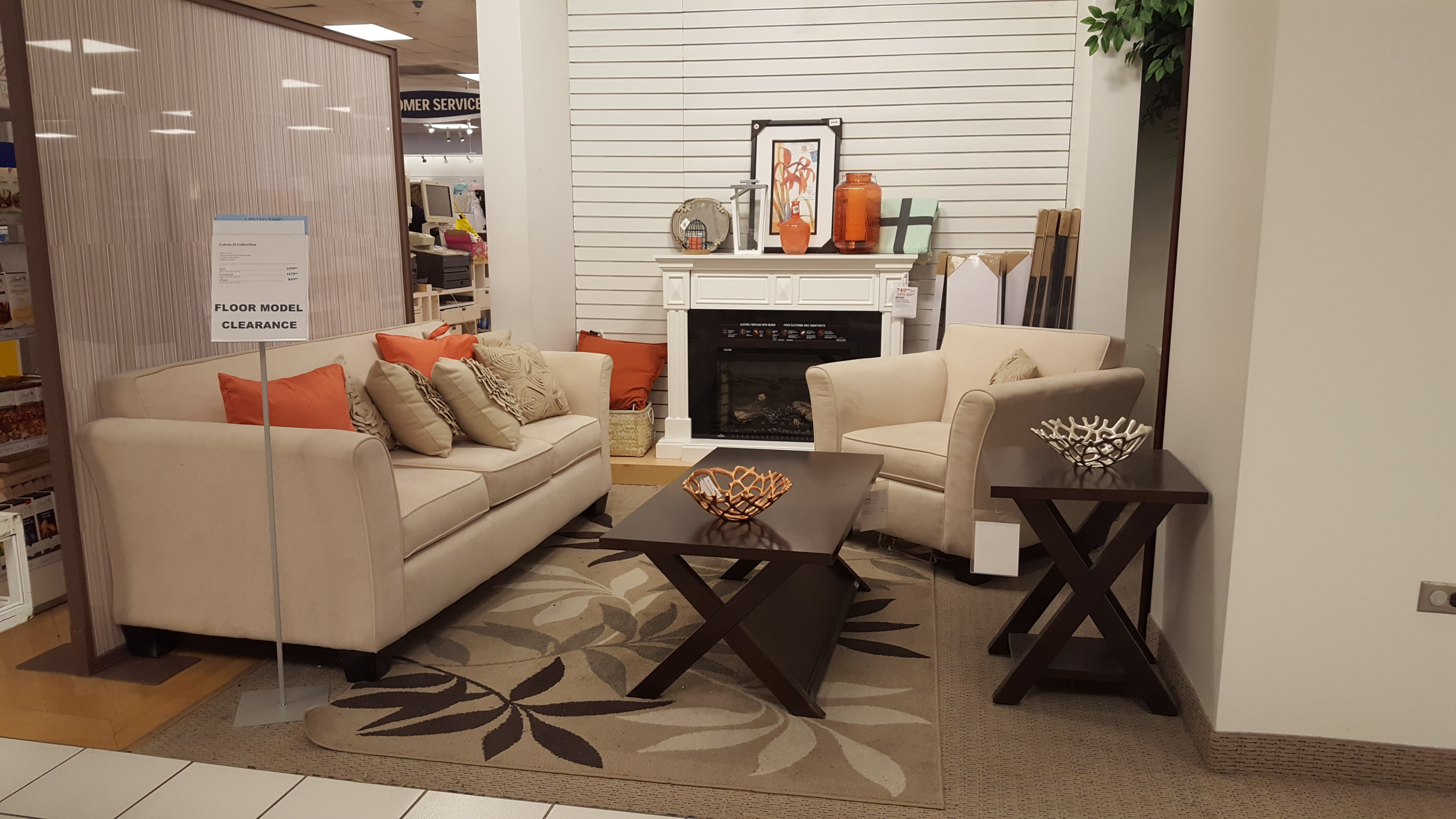
A living room floor model on clearance at a Sears Canada shop in Oakville

A floor model is a piece of equipment placed in a retail shop's sales area for display purposes. Floor models are taken out of their packaging and displayed how they would be used. In the case of furniture, stores will arrange pieces as they may be placed in the home. Appliances, such as microwaves, refrigerators, and washing machines, are typically put into rows, so customers may compare the different models. Consumer electronics are typically plugged into an electric outlet, cable or satellite television feed, or local area network as appropriate. In all cases, floor models allow customers to test the quality of the displayed merchandise, or compare between different models of a certain type.

Not all floor models are literally on the floor, but may be placed on a stock table. Because floor models see considerably more use and are subject to more wear and tear than they would if they were not used for display, stores may sometimes discount them when selling them. Mattress floor models are typically manufactured to be softer on one side than the other. This is done for comparison's sake, and does not reflect the actual merchandise.
