= Video game modding =

Modification of video games by fans

Video game modding (from "modifying") is the process of player and fan-authored alteration of a video game and is a sub-discipline of general modding. A set of modifications, called a mod, can either alter an existing game or add user-generated content. Modders, people who mod video games, can introduce a variety of changes to games, including altering graphics, fixing bugs, and adding unique gameplay elements. Mod development uses official or user-made software development kits, distinguishing it from in-game creations. Modding a game can also be understood as the act of seeking and installing mods to the player's game.

People can become fans of specific mods and can involve themselves in the process of mod development and discourse. In cases where modding is popular, players use the term vanilla to describe the unmodified game (e.g. "Vanilla Minecraft").

Mods that extensively transform gameplay are known as total conversions, with some developing into distinct games. As early as the 1980s, video game mods have also been used for the sole purpose of creating art, as opposed to a playable game, leading to the rise of artistic video game modification, as well as machinima and the demoscene.

With tens of thousands of mods created for popular games, the proliferation of video game modding has made it an increasingly important factor in the success of many games. Modding extends the replay value and interest of the game.

== History ==
=== Spacewar! (1962) and early endeavors ===
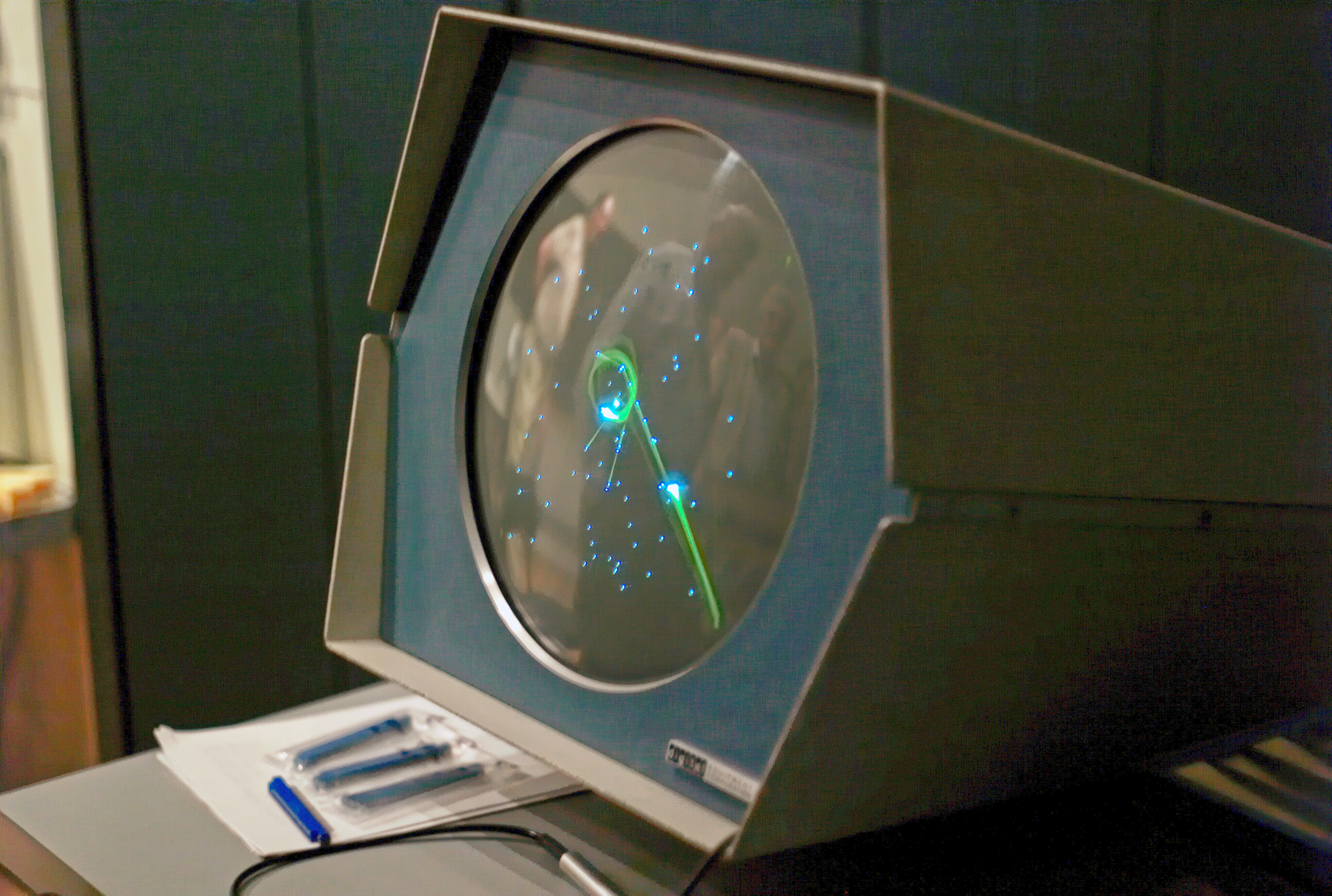
Spacewar! on a PDP-1

A specific date of origin for video game modding has not been agreed upon by historians, partly due to discussion over what constitutes a mod and partly because of insufficient historical documentation. However, the very first computer games already were being actively modified by the first generation of hackers, and researchers have described modding as an evolution of the hacker culture which pioneered the video game industry.

Widely considered one of the first computer games, the 1962 game Spacewar! was distributed freely as testing software for the PDP-1, an early computer. The game was a result of hardware and software experimentation, supported by the programming culture at the Massachusetts Institute of Technology (MIT). On university campuses where the computer was installed, programmers continued to experiment with the game by modifying it heavily, allured by the prospect of fixing a "dire problem [...] as easily as changing a few instructions", as Steven Levy describes. Their efforts resulted in a wave of improvements to Spacewar!, from changing aspects such as gameplay physics to creating new graphics. The final version of the game was ultimately a product of a group effort of hackers, who contributed to the game without pay. In this way, Spacewar! was not only the first video game, but also the first video game to be modded. On the popularity of hacking Spacewar!, Levy reflected:

Like any other program, it was placed in the drawer for anyone to access, look at, and rewrite as they saw fit. The group effort that stage by stage had improved the program could have stood for an argument for the Hacker Ethic: an urge to get inside the workings of the thing and make it better had led to measurable improvement. And of course it was all a huge amount of fun.

Other early video games also released as iterations of collaborative improvements. Colossal Cave Adventure, a text adventure game developed by Will Crowther and released in 1976, was greatly expanded upon by Stanford graduate Don Woods. After receiving the source code to the game from Crowther, Woods increased the game's complexity and released a modified version in 1977 to instant success. The desire to improve software—the "hacker ethic", as described by Levy—became a crucial factor to the emergence of modern modding culture.

Before the development of affordable and more accessible personal computers, the ability to mod games was restricted to where computers at the time were able to be installed, such as university campuses like MIT. With the advent of home computers in the late 1970s to early 1980s, such as the Apple II and the Commodore 64, video games were given a new space to flourish, accompanied by a new generation of modders. The subculture of "cracking" video games—hacking their source code—emerged as a niche endeavor among hobbyists. Cracks added gameplay cheats or removed copyright structures, allowing games to be distributed freely. Using basic file editing software and a program that would dump the contents of files, modders additionally scoured games for their assets through trial and error, with the goal of replacing them with their own levels and graphics. A famous example is Castle Smurfenstein, a modification of the 1981 Apple II game Castle Wolfenstein. Andrew Johnson and Preston Nevins, two high school students, replaced the game's Nazi characters with those from the popular 1980s cartoon The Smurfs. The game is often cited as a pioneering example of modding culture.

=== id Software, Doom (1993) ===
As video games grew more sophisticated, hacking them became an increasingly cumbersome task, often requiring modders to effectively write over the original content. While modders created amateur game editing tools out of necessity, they were often buggy, inefficient, and incomplete, ultimately necessitating good programming skills for mod development. New assets were processed through multiple software packages in order to be modded into the game engine. Scott Miller, founder of 3D Realms (formerly Apogee Software), was fascinated by the levels and level editors fans created for Apogee's 1991 game Duke Nukem, reflecting: "We just didn't expect players to take the time and effort to create their own development tools."

Modding continued with the release of Wolfenstein 3D in 1992, published by Apogee and developed by id Software, who had bought the rights to Castle Wolfenstein. Miller and his team at Apogee noted how modding helped extend the life of the game by providing free additional content for players. One such mod swapped the game's music with the theme song from the children's show Barney & Friends and replaced the final boss with Barney the Dinosaur. While some members of id were concerned about copyright infringement, id programmers and co-founders John Carmack and John Romero were delighted by the Barney mod. Carmack was surprised by its sophistication compared to the Apple II cheats he had created for games such as the Ultima series in the 1980s. Intrigued, he made a conscious effort to facilitate custom content creation when designing the company's next game, Doom.

Released in 1993, Doom was the first game to introduce modding to a wider audience due to the degree of depth it allowed its modders. With Wolfenstein 3D, players had to erase game data to replace it; this destructiveness concerned Carmack and Romero. When developing Doom, Carmack purposely separated the game engine files from other assets, including level architecture, graphics, and audio, which were stored in a "WAD" file (an acronym for "where's all the data?"). While the system was also motivated by the game industry's push towards realism that required larger storage, it was specifically intended to make modding easier. With Doom, modders only needed to change which WAD file the game would reference, meaning that custom assets could be modified and distributed without sharing the original game data.

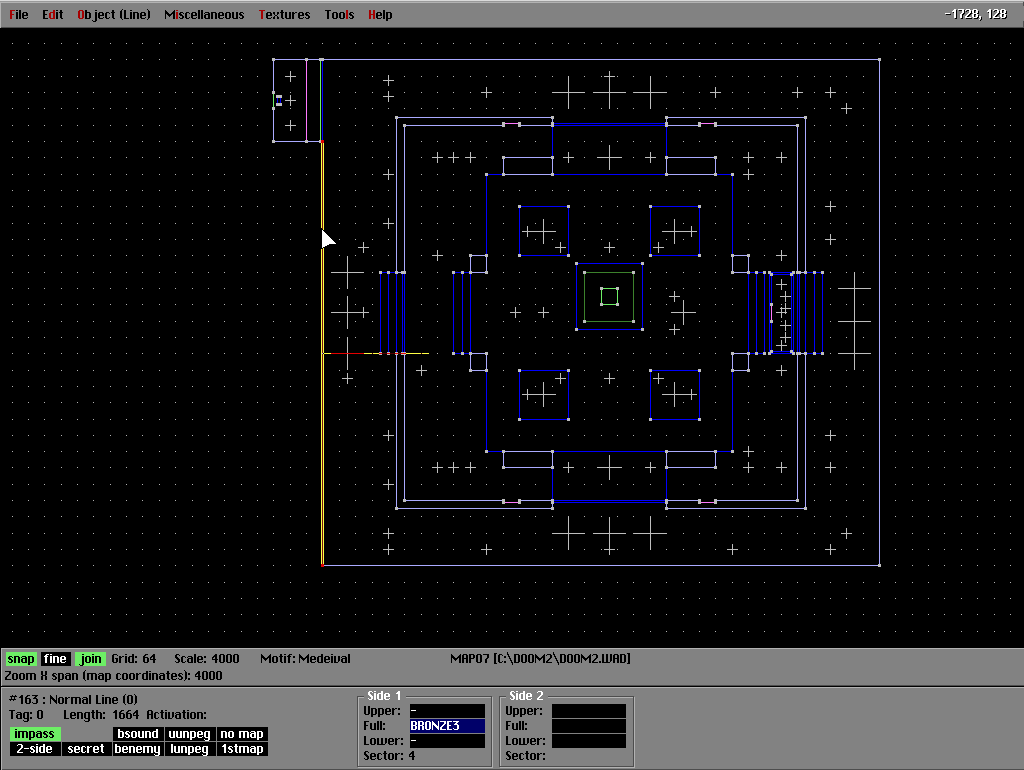
Doom Construction Kit, one of the first Doom level editors, released in 1994

Nearing the official release of Doom, Carmack sent emails to Wolfenstein modders, detailing the game's new modding capabilities. He also uploaded the source code for the game's level editing and utilities programs. Weeks after the release, hackers developed level and map-editing programs to modify existing Doom levels or make other minor adjustments. In 1994, the Doom Editor Utility was created by an international team of modders led by a student at the University of Canterbury, greatly lowering the skill threshold required to make a mod and advertising the ability to create entirely new levels. The DeHackEd from a University of Michigan student was released in the same year, which additionally allowed users to modify the executable file of the game. Later, in 1997, id published Doom as open source, allowing a greater customization of mods with the source code available. The open nature of Doom inspired a flood of creativity, with modding tools promising to "do almost anything to any level". Another factor in the popularity of Doom modding was the increasing popularity of the Internet and the advent of the World Wide Web, which allowed modding communities to form. Using online forums, modders were able to pool their knowledge and findings for the game.

At a time when the video game industry guarded their intellectual property through copyrights and patents, id Software's willingness to share details about their game's files was novel. Companies like Atari had sued modders in the past for copyright infringement, including a pair of MIT students who had sold modded circuitry intended for the Atari arcade game Missile Command. The release of the source code for Doom's editing software caused debate amongst the team at id, with Carmack's actions being supported by Romero. In exchange for the technical foundation for modding, id requested that mods should only work with the retail version of the game and not the shareware version, benefiting the company commercially. Later first-person shooter developers, such as Valve and Epic, consistently include level editing tools with their games, and it is common for role-playing and strategy games to make a level editor available.

By encouraging player-driven content, id created channels for entry into the video game industry for Doom's modding community. Final Doom, released by id in 1996, integrated fan-made levels, with a share of the profits going to the modders involved. In 1995, id hired Tim Willits as the first employee from the Doom modding community, who later became studio director of id's parent company ZeniMax Media.

=== Valve, Half-Life (1998), Steam ===
After the success of Doom, id software would release their future games as open source. Mods for id's Quake, such as "Capture the Flag" and "Team Fortress", became standard gamemodes in later games in the shooter genre. In addition to first-person shooters, which are popular games to mod, the virtual pet genre, with games such as Petz and Creatures, fosters younger modders, particularly girls.

Valve used WorldCraft, a fan-produced tool for Quake, to design Half-Life. In addition to its single-player campaign, Half-Life included the rudimentary multiplayer modes deathmatch and team deathmatch, a game mode created by John Romero for Doom. The multiplayer mods Day of Defeat and Counter-Strike became popular, and eventually Valve acquired them, giving them an official release.

With the increase in popularity of the modding scene, video game companies began to capitalize on the appeal of creating user-generated content. By the mid-1990s, PC games were commonly bundled with modding tools, external software which allows users to create mods for their paired games. Games that launched with these tools were noteworthy in review and often contributed to their commercial success; in 2003, eight of the top 10 selling PC video games were bundled with modding tools.

Steam, a video game digital distribution service created by Valve Corporation, was specifically designed for the proliferation of successful, stand-alone mods. The platform offered a US$995 licensing fee plus royalty for modders to distribute their games. With a beta release in 2002, Steam included a retail-version of Day of Defeat, originally a total conversion mod for Valve's Half-Life whose rights were purchased by the company. Gabe Newell, the founder of Valve, noted that his perception of video games shifted from viewing them as entertainment to embracing them as "productivity platforms". Since then, the client has become one of the largest online marketplaces for games. The platform introduced full support for finding and playing mods for Valve's Team Fortress 2, a game that itself originated as a mod for Quake. The Steam Workshop, introduced to the platform in 2012, allows players to mod Steam-hosted games directly within the interface.

=== Paid mods on Steam ===
In April 2015, Valve introduced paid mods to the Steam Workshop as an update to the free system already in place. Mod authors received a cut of the profits from mods sold through Steam, with the percentage being determined individually by game developers. The first game to utilize the feature was Bethesda's The Elder Scrolls V: Skyrim, with mod authors receiving 25 percent of profit from their sales while the remainder was split between Valve and Bethesda. Gabe Newell, the head of Valve, expressed that paid mods would "increase the investment in quality modding", while not infringing on the need for freely distributed mods. The Workshop update resulted in backlash from the modding community, with complaints including having to pay for previously free mods; overpriced mods; content that had been published without its creator's consent; and concerns over mods that contained third-party copyrighted content (i.e., material that neither Valve nor the mod creator owned). Paid mod authors were also the target of backlash, with some receiving death threats and harassing comments. A Change.org petition was launched to remove the feature, garnering over 130,000 signatures. A week after the feature's announcement, Valve discontinued it entirely and agreed to refund those who purchased mods through the system. The removal itself was criticized by mod developers.

== Development ==
Developing a video game mod requires a range of technical and social skills, such as programming, 3D modeling, sound design, art, and project management. Modders represent a wide spectrum of individuals with varying degrees of experience, skill sets, motivations, and specializations, often working in teams. Using community feedback and bug reports, mod authors release a median of two updates to their mods, often back-to-back, according to an empirical study of mods hosted on the website Nexus Mods. A majority of mods on the platform are released over 300 days after a game's release, indicating that mod developers are either long-time players or have developed a renewed interest in a game.

Video game consoles remain largely proprietary and are equipped with strict security measures and a closed infrastructure that prohibits modding. In some cases, the console versions of games, such as Fallout 4, allow modding through in-game menus, subject to approval. In 2016, Sony began a limited program to allow mods for the PlayStation 4 version of The Elder Scrolls V: Skyrim. These mods are often subject to size limitations and prohibit the use of external assets.

=== Tools ===
Mod development involves the use of external software development kits (SDK) that are not included in the original game, distinguishing mods from in-game creations such as character creation in The Sims or levels designed in Lemmings. Early commercial mod-making tools include the Boulder Dash Construction Kit, released in 1986, and The Bard's Tale Construction Set, released in 1991, which allow users to create games using the engines of their predecessors. In 1983, Lode Runner was released with a level editor in which users could make and save levels to share with other players on the same computer. It is considered one of the first games to support user mods. Released in 1993, Forgotten Realms: Unlimited Adventures allows users to construct games based on the Pool of Radiance game world.

The provision of tools is seen as the most practical way that a company can signal to fans that its game is available to mod. As of 2020, 9 out of 10 of the most modded games on Nexus Mods have an official modding tool from the game developer. Many tools use the lightweight scripting language Lua, facilitating a simple and accessible medium to create mods. These tools are often similar to the ones used by the game developer. Maxis released modding tools for The Sims before the game itself, resulting in a suite of fan-created mods available at launch. The advertising campaign for Neverwinter Nights focused on the included Aurora toolset. The World Editor for Warcraft III allowed a variety of custom scenarios or maps to be created for the game, such as a number of tower defense and multiplayer online battle arena (MOBA) maps, including Defense of the Ancients. Bethesda Game Studios offers the Creation Kit, a program containing user-tailored modding tools used to create mods for their games, including The Elder Scrolls V: Skyrim.

Modders also create and use open-source software tools for creating mods. With games where modding is unsanctioned, these user-developed tools are the only resources available to develop mods. Examples include tools written to view 3D-geometry and programs used to import this data into 3D-applications, such as Maya or Autodesk 3ds Max. Because game developers encrypt their game's files, unsanctioned modding requires reverse engineering the structure of the game through extracting and decrypting files. This process is facilitated through the sharing of game files on modding forums, such as the XeNTaX community which produced modded versions of Metal Gear Solid V: The Phantom Pain starting in 2015. Generative AI has been used, particularly for assets such as textures and voice acting, which can present a barrier to entry for amateur mod teams. Voice actors have raised ethical concerns over their voices being cloned without their consent, and they have denounced pornographic mods that use their cloned voices.

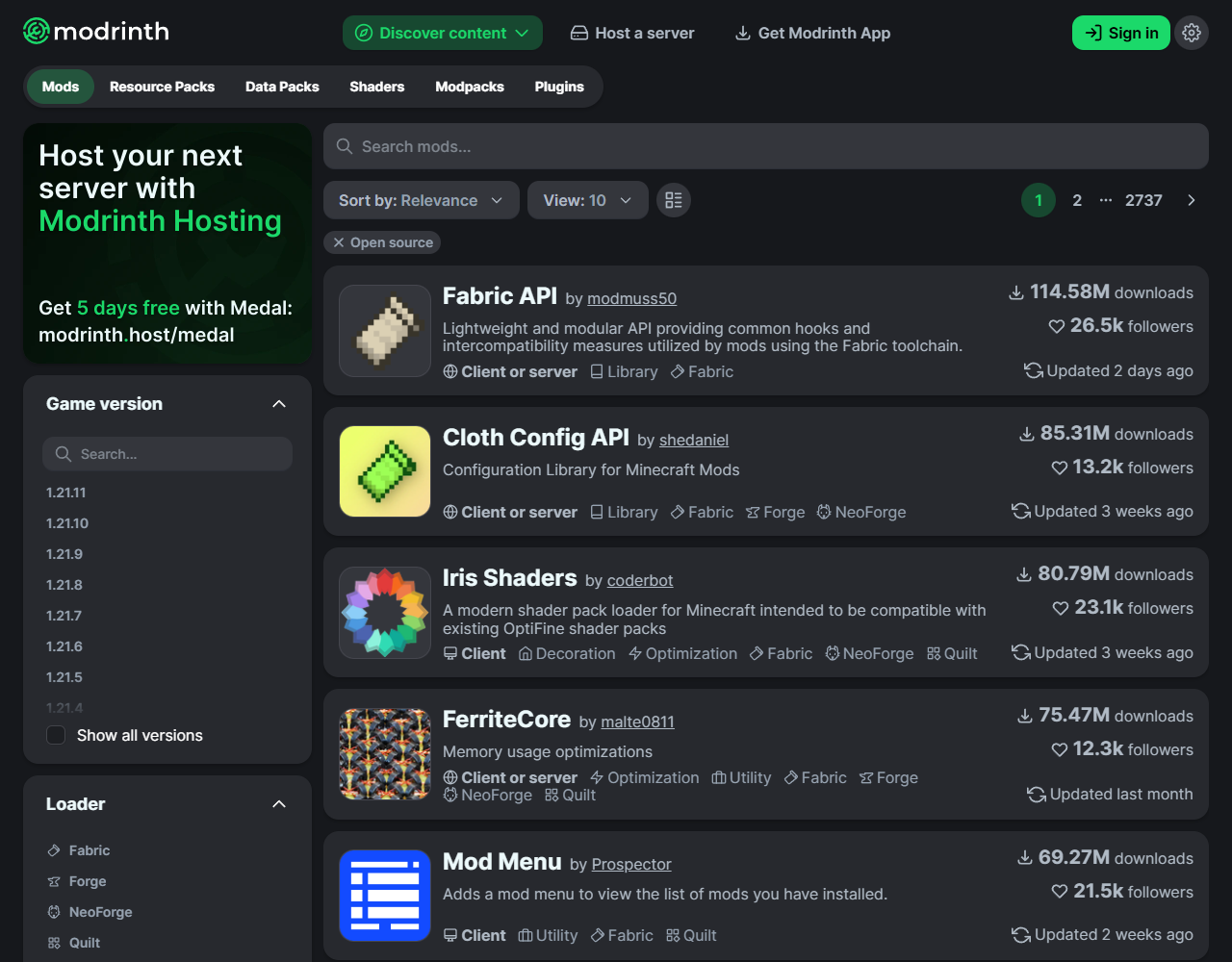
Dedicated websites are used to host and share mods. Pictured is the Minecraft mods website Modrinth.

Websites for hosting and sharing mods are widely used by the modding community. ModDB was founded in 2002, with over 300 million mod downloads as of 2025. Since its inception in 2001, Nexus Mods has become one of the largest modding websites; as of 2024, the website has over 47 million members and hosts a total of 539,682 mod files, developed by 128,361 mod authors. The website accrued a lifetime total of 10 billion mod downloads for 2,683 games the same year. Other websites are dedicated to the modding scenes of specific games. Large mod teams often host their own websites to showcase the development of their mods. These websites feature detailed database and advanced search functionality that allow users to easily find mods for their games, becoming social centers for modders and their shared knowledge. Additionally, video-hosting websites, blogs, and official game discussion forums provide channels for users to discuss and discover mods.

Free content delivery tools, known as "mod managers", are available to streamline the mod installation process and aid players who are less technically literate. These tools manage downloads, updates, and mod installation. Steam offers the Steam Workshop within the game launcher itself, allowing a users to share mods for simplified download and installation in supported games. Game developers also create official mod managers either alongside their games, such as the Paradox Launcher for games created by Paradox Interactive, or within the games themselves, such as in Baldur's Gate 3.

=== Game support ===
A game that allows modding is said to be moddable, and the extent to which a game can be modded is called its moddability. In general, moddable games will define gameplay variables in text or other non-proprietary format files and have graphics of a standard format, such as bitmaps. Developers can also foster mod-friendliness by making source files more accessible, such as Doom separating its art assets from the main program. Released in 2007, Supreme Commander was developed with the goal of being the as customizable as possible through mods. Some mods increase moddability by adding scripting support or externalizing underlying code. In 2025, mod authors released a script extender for The Elder Scrolls IV: Oblivion Remastered, which has no official mod support, in less than six hours after the game's release.

Video game developer reception of player contribution in creating new material for games and mod-communities is varied. Some software companies openly accept and even encourage such communities, with moddability being a contributing factor to the some games' success. Others have chosen to enclose their games in heavily policed copyright or Intellectual Property regimes (IPR) and shut down sites infringing on their ownership of a game.

== Motivations ==
While a few modders have a pre-existing desire to create modifications for the games they play, most modders start modding more or less accidentally, utilizing their prior interests like drawing, architecture, and programming. Their motivations for creating mods vary and often changes over time. Motivations can range from a general interest in their favorite game and the desire to modify it, to personal interests like artistic self-expression and technical challenges, as well as wanting to participate in a modding community. While a modder may be motivated by a combination of factors, there is typically one primary motivator.

Modding can serve as a pathway to entering the video game industry, with mod makers often featuring mod projects in their portfolios when applying for jobs in the industry. Modding tools provide the opportunity to acquire or refine information technology expertise for novices with prospects of eventually working in the games industry or related fields. Alternatively, becoming a professional may be unimportant to modders due to their strong sense of community, instead opting to keep the skill simply as a hobby. Researcher Hector Postigo identifies the hacker ethic as a contributor to the blurring between amateur and professional game development, where programming skill grants prestige in hacker communities.

=== Game customization ===
The modded character models of Kratos, Carl Johnson and Snow White in Guitar Hero World Tour. An example of modding acting as remix culture.

One of the primary motivations for modding is the ability to directly alter or expand a game the modder personally enjoys playing.

The proliferation of mod culture exemplifies the overlap between media consumption and production. Modding is viewed as a way to increase enjoyment of the game through personalization, such as the inclusion of popular or national culture of personal significance. With the provision of modding tools by the developer or other modders, players are granted agency to contribute to their entertainment experience. Modding is akin to other user-made practices in video game consumption, including speedrunning and machinima—all of which appropriate the original game and transform it into something new, exemplifying the flexibility of the video game space. However, modding can also stem from a dissatisfaction with the base game's limitations on customization.

Beyond expanding or transforming gameplay, many modders are motivated by a pursuit of realism. This may involve recreating recognizable real-world elements, such as landmarks, vehicles, and consumer brands. Real-life locations are often added to extend the map of simulation games, such as the addition of Polish settlements and landmarks in Euro Truck Simulator 2. In other games like as Euro Truck Simulator and Second Life, mods accurately reproduce brands and real-life products, while others invent fictitious brands that share similarities to real ones, such as 'McDowel' restaurant mods for Second Life, which imitate McDonald's. First-person shooters may have mods that replace weapon sounds with custom ones recorded by modders. Other mods intend to address historical accuracy. Mods for Civilization IV alter the game's historical flags to be more accurate, offering multiple variations to reflect their change over history. For flags with little historical documentation, modders debated over the culture's use of colors and iconography.

=== Self-expression ===
A mod for Super Smash Bros. Melee recolors Marth into the colors of the transgender flag.

Modding can be an outlet for artistic and political expression. Players can express their belief systems, personal preferences, or political opinions through modding, incorporating these cultural elements in a recreation of themselves. For example, flag mods for Civilization IV allow players to express their interests outside the historical scope of the game. Another mod added a playable Chechen faction when the developer grew sympathetic to the group in their conflict with Russia.

Mods can be a tool to create diversity and recreate body images from real life. For players who identify as LGBTQ, motivations for modding can stem from a lack of representation in a game and its modding community. Options for homosexual romance and character genders are made available through "queer mods". Examples include the "Equal Love Mod" for Dragon Age: Origins and a similar mod for Mass Effect, which enable romance with characters normally unavailable for their protagonist's gender. Researcher Evan Lauteria theorized that queer mods can be an act of resistance against the limitations on sexual normativity enacted by the game, such as compulsory heterosexuality.

Likewise, programmers may be motivated by the innate challenge of hacking a game as a "complex code-based system", often creating mod tools for other mod makers.

=== Sense of community ===
Modder communities are made up of people with diverse interests, from military and social history to technological expertise. Combined, these skills add to the richness of mods. Taking part in online discussions on modding forums is a cause of community feeling among modders.

Modding has been described as a part of remix culture and as a successor to the hacker culture that produced the first video games. It has been correlated with the introduction of Web 2.0, which encourages collaboration and participation via the Internet through the production and alteration of user-generated content. The sense of community, feedback, recognition, and sources of inspiration fostered through online, collaborative discussions are various motivators that influence the development and sharing of mods. This sense of community can transcend alienation and help challenge the stigma that gaming is "antisocial, isolating, or creatively stifling".

== Impact ==
The game industry's support of modding has been crucial to the rise of the modding phenomenon. In contrast to the music and film industries, which discourage unauthorized modification and adaptation of their mediums through copyright law, many video game companies encourage modding of their games for creative inspiration, commercial success, and as a marketing strategy. Although concerns have been raised about the exploitation of modders as a source of free labor, most modders view their work as a fun, labor of love for themselves and the community, rather than for the company.

Modding can extend the shelf life of games, leading to increased revenue for their developers and publishers. Valve attributed the long-lasting success of Half-Life, whose sales figures increased over the first three years of its release, to popular mods for the game. Beginning in 1999, the company held an annual mod expo showcasing new games built using GoldSrc, the Half-Life engine, including Gunman Chronicles and Counter Strike which both later released as stand-alone titles. In early 2012, the DayZ mod for ARMA 2 was released, causing a massive increase in sales for the three-year-old game and putting it in the top spot for online game sales for a number of months. As of 2020, the top three games by esports prize pools all originated as mods: Dota 2 (US$174 million), Counter-Strike: Global Offensive (US$69M), and League of Legends (US$64M).

Creative collaboration through game modding communities is an influential medium. User-developed mods can test new approaches for video game development, offloading time and cost from the developer who may then adopt mod changes and additions for official releases. The multiplayer online battle arena (MOBA) video game genre was developed and popularized from mods of Blizzard's StarCraft and Warcraft III. With League of Legends host to over 35 million players in 2012, the MOBA has since become one of the most successful genres of video games. The developer of the Civilization series, Firaxis has included user mods, "Double Your Pleasure", throughout expansion packs for the franchise. Series developer Sid Meier, who had previously opposed mods in the franchise, later said that "the strength of the modding community is [...] the very reason the series survived". Valve hired Defense of the Ancients lead designer IceFrog for the development of the stand-alone, official sequel.

The introduction of real-life brands through video game mods can result in positive brand reception, increased further through discussions on modding forums and video hosting websites.

== Issues ==
=== Legal status ===
Copyright law relating to video games and mods is an evolving legal issue. Uncertainty revolves around which party is legally the copyright owner of the mods—the company that produced the game, the creators of the individual mods, or the player that installed the mods. Under current law, mods are viewed as derivative works, as they are based upon or incorporate part of the original game and are developed by a third-party without a license.

In US copyright law, different statutes cover various aspects of video games, such as graphics, audio, and source code. Most pertinent is the Copyright Act of 1976 (17 U.S.C. § 102), which protects "pictorial, graphic, and sculptural works", "sound recordings", and "literary works", among others. In past cases, mods have been viewed as derivative works not classifiable under fair use, and they are violations of the copyright holder's consent if developed without permission. Additionally, the mechanisms of how the modder accesses video game source code may violate the US Digital Millennium Copyright Act, through circumvention of technological measures intended to prevent the game from being copied. Mods are "presumptively illegal" when they breach a game's end-user license agreement (EULA) and terms of service (TOS), as is prohibited under the Computer Fraud and Abuse Act.

Despite the lack of legal protection, modding continues to thrive due to encouragement from video game developers, who make moddable games. The companies' willingness to allow modification of their property is typically outlined in the game's legal contracts, including its EULA and TOS. Companies that wish to encourage modding often include terms that grant them ownership over any user-generated content (UGC) created for their games. An example is Electronic Arts (EA), who qualifies modding for their games, such as The Sims 4, according to their EULA from 2022: "When you contribute UGC, you grant to EA […] sublicensable license to use, host, store, reproduce, modify, create derivative works, publicly perform, publicly display or otherwise transmit and communicate the UGC".

Other companies discourage modding through aggressive litigation in addition to strict legal contracts. In the 1998 case Micro Star v. FormGen Inc., the courts granted FormGen, the publisher of Duke Nukem 3D, a preliminary injunction against Micro Star, who packaged user-made level mods for the game and sold it as Nuke It. FormGen had stipulated in its license for the game that player-made levels must be offered for free. Modding poses a threat to artistic control that may lead game companies to pursue litigation against mod developers. In 2009, Square Enix sent a cease and desist letter to mod developers that used art from a ROM file of their game Chrono Trigger, threatening "up to $150,000 damages per work". Additionally, companies may take legal action against mods for multiplayer games which could impact fairness. Square Enix sent another cease and desist in 2025 to a developer whose mod allowed other players to view each other's modded characters in the online game Final Fantasy XIV. Officially, mods are against the TOS of the game, with game producer Naoki Yoshida arguing that such mods "negatively impact the core game, its services, [and] intended game design".

Another concern is the use of copyrighted material owned by another company, such as a mod for Quake themed around Alien vs. Predator which was legally contested by 20th Century Fox. At least one modder received legal action from Mattel for the unauthorised use of the character Thomas the Tank Engine in a The Elder Scrolls V: Skyrim mod. Some modders regard the use of copyrighted material in mods to be part of a "moral economy", often settling on a system of shared ownership, where mods and code are freely shared with the common good in mind. "Moral ownership" over games they play leads modders to appropriate proprietary material and ignore copyright altogether. It has been argued that total conversion mods may be covered in the United States under the concept of fair use. Modding can be compared to the open-source-software movement and open-source video game development. In 2006, Second Life generated interest from its focus of user-generated content (mods) and how intellectual property rights to this content remained with the creator. Second Life players are able to sell these items in an in-game market.

Literature on user-generated content in video games in the context of UK and European copyright law is limited. Scholarship mostly concerns the liabilities of intermediaries who provide this content rather than creators themselves.

The UK National Crime Agency reported that modding can act as a pathway to cybercrime. In 2015, members from GTAForums, a Grand Theft Auto fan site, reported instances of malware being circulated through mods written for Grand Theft Auto V. Two of the mods in question, "Angry Planes" and "No Clip", came with malicious code for loading a remote access tool and a keylogger for stealing Facebook and Steam account credentials.

=== Controversial mods ===
Mods can alter games to reveal nudity and explicit content or introduce it via modded graphics. After the "Hot Coffee" mod incident, the games industry called for better control of explicit mods. In 2025, Take-Two Interactive filed a DMCA complaint against two nude mods, hosted on Nexus, for a character in Mafia: The Old Country. Kotaku noted that the later-removed mods tweaked the game's preexisting nude character model, simply allowing it to appear throughout the game. Bethesda Softworks does not allow mods with nudity to be uploaded to its platforms. Nexus Mods allows for mods with nudity as long as nudity is not present in the preview image for the download page, such as Caliente's Beautiful Bodies Edition, which allows for body modification in Bethesda's Skyrim and Fallout 4 and has been downloaded at least 8.2 million times. Video game mods are also subject to regional legislation on pornography. Nexus Mods plans to add age verification to mods containing explicit content to comply with the Online Safety Act in the UK and Digital Services Act in the EU.

Game developers and publishers retain the discretion to limit and remove political and discriminatory mods for their games. In 2016, Paradox Interactive took down a Steam Workshop mod for their game Stellaris which replaced non-white human characters with white ones, stating that they did not "wish to enable discriminatory practices". As of 2025, EA's mod policy stated that they held the right to "address any inappropriate Mods", including those with obscene or objectionable content. In the same year, the company submitted a copyright infringement notice to forums hosting a The Sims 4 mod which altered or removed representations of LGBTQ and Black people.

Additionally, mod-hosting websites have removed potentially objectionable or divisive mods. Ahead of the 2020 United States presidential election, Nexus Mods updated their Terms of Service to state that content that promotes "conflict, division and mob harassment" would be removed. In 2025, the website removed a mod for Marvel Rivals which replaced the model for Captain America with one of Donald Trump, citing the updated policy. Additionally, the website has removed several mods that targeted LGBTQ themes, including a mod which removed pride flags from Marvel's Spider-Man; a mod which changed the gender of a non-player character (NPC) in a same-sex relationship in Baldur's Gate 3; and a mod which changed the "body type" option to male or female for The Elder Scrolls IV: Oblivion Remastered.

With the development of coding tools using AI large language models (LLMs), some users have created mods mashing up games using vibe coding through LLMs. Such mods generally require decompliation of existing mods as to create the new content, which depending on the origin of the game or existing mod, may be against the legal rights for such software. The use of AI to create mods is generally discouraged, and Nexus Mods bans the use of AI content that incorporates material the programmer did not have legal rights towards, but the volume of such mods around September 2026 became a concern that eventually these would be accepted into Nexus Mods.

=== Paid mods ===
While generally satisfied with working for free, mod authors can create and sell mods for various titles through game developer-created channels, including Bethesda's Verified Creators Program for their games and InZOI's Creation Marketplace. Typically, game companies forbid the commercial sale of mods through their EULAs, including Blizzard Entertainment, who updated their policies in 2009 to disallow the sale and soliciation of donations for third-party add-ons for World of Warcraft. If the EULA allows for it, authors can accept donations for their mods independently on crowdfunding websites, such as Patreon and Ko-fi, avoiding restrictions on direct sales. Mod uploaders on Nexus Mods can earn "donation points", which they can trade in for real-world currency sourced from a donated pool. Over $12 million has been paid to top creators on the platform since 2018.

The implementation of "paid mod" systems has been controversial. Since their attempted introduction on Steam, the market generally has steered away from paid mods. In 2022, Electronic Arts updated their policy to disallow "money transactions of any type" for independently distributed paid mods for The Sims 4. Criticisms of the change came from Sims 4 creators and mod authors who sold mods through an early access model on crowdfunding websites and released completed mods for free. The policy was later updated to allow paid mods using the early access model while still prohibiting completed mods sold with an explicit paywall. In 2024, Nexus Mods clarified their policies regarding the hosting of paid mods, including disallowing mods that require other paid mods as a prerequisite as well as lite and demo versions of externally hosted paid mods, citing that paid modding is "in direct conflict" with their goal of making modding easy. Bethesda replaced their Creation Club with Creations, a new system for free and paid mod hosting and distribution within their titles such as Skyrim. Implemented in 2023, reception of the system was widely negative, with criticisms of the price, the harm on the community, and the practice of abandoning free mods in favor of pushing paid updated versions. The system was present in the 2024 release of Starfield, where it received similar negative reception. However, Creations has also been praised as a mutually beneficial platform that allows modders to work with game developers and have their work promoted in game.

Arguments against paid mods have been diverse across mod users and developers. Some users denounce developers who sell mods as "sellouts", arguing that modding should be a "labor-of-love". Criticism has been drawn towards the price of cosmetic mods, with users pointing out that the sale of third-party assets used in many mods could be classified as copyright infringement. With Steam's introduction of paid mods in 2015, users were apprehensive about the centralization and surveillance of modding, as all submitted mods had to be approved by Steam. Other users mentioned that creators deserve to be compensated for their work and were open to paying for extensively elaborate mods.

== Types ==
In the context of video games, the words "mod" and "modification" are not primarily academic terms and are sometimes used in conflicting ways to encompass and distinguish varieties of alterations to video games. Generally, as defined and used by players, mod makers, and gaming press, the definition of video game modding is the alteration or addition of content to an existing video game with user-generated content, particularly on PC. This understanding can significantly differ between game genres. As modding is an evolving concept, there is no exhaustive list of all types of mods nor agreement on what each type of mod encompasses.

=== Total conversion ===
A total conversion is a mod of an existing game that extensively removes aspects of the original game, including art, characters, plot, and music, and replaces it with new assets that run on the game's engine. Total conversions can result in a completely different genre from the original.

Examples of famous total conversions include Counter-Strike, whose developers were hired by Valve to create a standalone version, Defense of the Ancients, which was the first MOBA to have sponsored tournaments, and Garry's Mod, for which fans created thousands of game modes over its decade-long development. The Half-Life modding community splintered across the different total conversions available, often modding for a particular total conversion rather than Half-Life in general. Equestria at War, a total conversion mod based on the animated television series My Little Pony: Friendship Is Magic, is a popular mod of Hearts of Iron IV, placing seventh in the players' vote for Mod DB's 2023 Mod of the Year awards.

Many popular total conversions are later turned into standalone games, replacing any remaining original assets to allow for commercial sale without copyright infringement. Some of these mods are even approved for sale while using the IP of the original game, such as Black Mesa. League of Legends and Dota 2 were both originally mods for Warcraft III: Reign of Chaos.

Due to the increasing complexity of games, the amount and quality of total conversion mods has decreased. Modders also blame a lack of resources, the remote chances of profit (due to EULAs prohibiting the sale of mods), and the likelihood of a takedown notice from game companies as significant barriers to entry.

=== Overhaul ===
An overhaul mod significantly changes an entire game's graphics and gameplay, usually with the intent to improve on the original, but not going as far as being a completely different experience. This can also include adding revised dialog and music.

Examples of overhaul mods include Deus Ex: Revision, which was given permission from its publisher, Square Enix, to release on Steam alongside the original game, and GTA 5 Redux, which improves the original game's textures, adds a new weather system, and adjusts visual effects, the wanted system, weapons, and vehicle handling.

=== Randomizer ===
Randomizers are a type of user mod that keep the fundamental gameplay but randomize elements of the game to make it more of a challenge. Randomizers came out of the speedrunning community which had exhausted the challenge of racing through the game. Their popularity grew as randomizer playthroughs were popular with streaming media. Some games have offered official randomizer modes in the game itself, such as Cassette Beasts in 2023, or in downloadable content, including Bloodstained: Ritual of the Night in 2020, and Axiom Verge in 2021.

=== Add-on ===
An add-on or addon is a term which encompasses various levels of complexity, including mods, maps, skins, and other changes to game play. Typically, it is small mod which adds to the original content of a specific game.

=== Unofficial patch ===
An unofficial patch is a mod of an existing game that fixes bugs in a game or unlocks content normally inaccessible in official gameplay. Unofficial patches can reveal cut content from released games, whose files can be left in the game's code. An example is the Hot Coffee mod for Grand Theft Auto: San Andreas, which unlocks a sexually explicit minigame not accessible in the game's original release but left in its code. As a result of the mod, the ESRB changed the rating of the game from Mature (M) to Adults Only (AO). In the fourth quarter of 2005, Rockstar released a "clean" version of the game with the "Hot Coffee" scenes removed, and the rating of the game was reverted to Mature. In May 2006, a similar event occurred with The Elder Scrolls IV: Oblivion.

=== Accessibility ===
Accessibility mods aim to improve the gaming experience for people with disabilities. Because many mainstream video games lack comprehensive accessibility features, modders often create tools to assist players with controls, difficulty settings, and in-game navigation. In particular, these mods may include support for screen readers, color filters and graphical adjustments for colorblind players, modified audio cues, and pathfinding systems, among other features.

=== Art mod ===
An art mod is a mod that is created for artistic reasons or to provoke a reaction in the audience. Art mods are frequently associated with video game art. Modified games that retain their playability and are subject to more extensive mods (i.e. closer to total conversions) may also be classified as art games. One example is the Velvet-Strike mod for Counter Strike, in which the players spray paint anti-violence messages in multiplayer games as a form of performance art. In Robert Nideffer's Tomb Raider I and II patches, the unofficial Nude Raider patch of the late 1990s was alluded to and subverted by altering the main character's sexual orientation. The 1983 mod Castle Smurfenstein is a humorous subversion of Castle Wolfenstein which replaces the Nazi guards with Smurfs.

Mods can be created specifically for the production of recorded videos, whether for artistic expression or other storytelling purposes. In 2022, a group of modders started an internet hoax in which they uploaded gameplay recording of the 2017 game Nier: Automata on PC that showed off a purported secret, never-before-seen location in the game. Fans of the game theorized how to unlock the region in their own copies, and the game's director, Yoko Taro, cryptically acknowledged the hoax but neither confirmed nor denied it as true. After over a month, the creators revealed that the faked footage was created using a modded version of the game and released the mod to the public along with map-modding tools that were first of their kind for the game.

=== Support continuation by mods ===
Games no longer actively supported by developers and publishers can be maintained and improved by player-made mods. After EA ended support for MVP Baseball 2005, due to losing the license for the Major League Baseball, the game's modding community continued to support it by releasing updated roster lists and graphics mods every year, along with modding alternative baseball leagues for the game. Multiple mods were created for the poorly received 2011 game IL-2 Sturmovik: Cliffs of Dover to fix bugs and gameplay issues; modders later received source code access, culminating in an official re-release of the game. Following the closure of Ion Storm, the source code for Daikatana was released to a select group of modders, who led the version 1.3 patch and ported the game to MacOS, Linux and FreeBSD. Mods are also created for older PC games that are incompatible for modern display resolutions, such as the DXX-Rebirth and DXX-Redux mods for the 1995 game Descent.

=== User interface mod ===
A user interface mod changes parts of how players interact with the game, revealing information that the player or modder believes is helpful to players. Modders have developed a wide range of UI mods for World of Warcraft that includes easier command tools to enhanced data presentation displays, such as the ArkInventory mod which allows players to sort items into self-created categories.

=== Mod packs ===
Mod packs are groups of mods put into one package for download, often with an auto-installer. A mod pack's purpose is to make it easier for the player to install and manage multiple mods. Mod packs may be created with the purpose of making the original game more accessible to new players or to make the game more challenging for veteran players.

== See also ==
Modding of specific games:

- Grand Theft Auto modding
- Half-Life modding
- Half-Life 2 modding
- Minecraft modding
- Skyrim modding

Other:

- Creative consumer
- Fan labor
- Homebrew (video games) – software for proprietary video game consoles produced by consumers and hobbyists
- Level editor
- ROM hacking – modification of the ROM file of a video game
