= Tournament.com =

- Type: Private
- Industry: Online gaming
- Founded: United Kingdom April 2007
- Founder: Marcus Pearcey, Richard Skelhorn, Alex Holt
- Defunct: November 2007
- Fate: Service postponed
- Headquarters: Norwich, Norfolk, United Kingdom
- Key people: Marcus Pearcey, Richard Skelhorn, Alex Holt

Tournament.com was a competitive online gaming service which offered cash prizes. It operated in a limited 12hr beta prior to April 2007 then went to a full 24hr beta test between April 2007 and November 2007. It looked to go fully live during January 2008, before being suspended in November 2007.

== History ==
Tournament.com was co-founded in May 2007 by Richard Skelhorn, Alex Holt and Marcus Pearcey and based in Norwich. The site allowed players to bet on matches in a "skill-based environment" and had the exclusive rights from Valve for competitive use of Counter-Strike: Source, Day of Defeat: Source and Half-Life 2: Deathmatch.

In November 2007, Tournament.com ceased operating, with Pearcey announcing that the service was postponed but not officially shut down. A combination of costly infrastructure and players' unwillingness to deposit money forced the company to rethink its business model.

Co founders Richard Skelhorn and Alex Holt have stayed in the online gaming arena having set up bgo.com.

== Gaming model ==
Players first had to download client software to participate. They were then able to compete against friends, or against people of a similar skill level (through its own proprietary 'SmarkRank' calculation), in online games with a small prize pot on offer. Most games cost from 20c, (rising to maximum of $10) so the stakes were correspondingly low. The service had a cap on the amount of money a player may deposit each month, so potential losses were limited. One advantage of this model was a reduced number of griefers, which Eurogamer considered to be worth the price of entry, and an over-18 age restriction limiting the amount of immature chatting. Cheating was controlled by 24-hour human oversight and compulsory anti-cheat software called 'TAC' running alongside Steams VAC2 software. Potential lag issues are dealt with by investing heavily in game server infrastructure.
