= Lenovo Erazer =

Desktop computer

The Lenovo Erazer is a line of desktop computers designed for gaming and other high-performance computing tasks.

== Launch ==
The Erazer X700 was announced by Lenovo at the 2013 International Consumer Electronics Show in Las Vegas. It launched in May 2013 with a starting price in the United States of $1,499.

== Models ==
=== Erazer X700 ===
==== Design ====
The Erazer X700 has a highly stylized case that TechRadar said is "like the sort of extraterrestrial hardware that comes from folks like Alienware." TechRadar added, "On the outside, the Erazer X700 looks an unused design from Prometheus. It's all blue lights, bubbled black plastic and geometric lines. With a power button labeled Engine Start in blue LED, it's your call whether the X700 is more racecar than spacecraft. Either way it's a tad gaudy, but no sci-fi nightmare. There are some functional touches amongst the glowing glamor."

==== Specifications and performance ====
The Erazer X700 is powered by Intel's i7 processor. The X700 can be configured with either dual GeForce GTX660 video cards or a single AMD Radeon HD 8950 video card. Up to 16GB of DDR3 SDRAM is supported. Users can choose standard configurations with 2TB or 1TB hard drives with bays sufficient for an additional 4TBs of hard drive capacity.

The X700 has what Lenovo calls "OneKey" overclocking ability that can be activated with a single case-mounted button. This functionality is supported by the Erazer X700's internal liquid cooling system. The X700 has USB ports and headphone jacks like other PCs, but also has connections for six displays.

== Reviews ==
In its review of the x700 TechRadar said, "Our playtime with the Erazer X700 was limited, but we got the chance to put boots and tank treads on the ground with some Battlefield 3. The game's tense tank showdowns were big and bombastic as ever, and rig maintained the intense frame rate needed to control an F/a 18 jet on a strafing run." TechRadar also stated, "We're intrigued to see Lenovo enter the gaming space with a dedicated rig. Competition from a reputable manufacturer never hurts the consumer. With the launch of one system, this isn't exactly Dell's acquisition of Alienware, but it's an exciting start."

In a review for Techspot Rick Burgess wrote, "Despite its faults, the Erazer’s sharp-looking custom case, liquid cooling, X79-based motherboard, dual-graphics option, removable storage trays and overclocking all manage to plant one foot firmly in gamer country. The X700 can comfortably handle modern titles at 1920x1080 and high/ultra settings and most features enabled... as long as you don’t mind turning off MSAA. The possibility of adding a second GTX 660 GPU for SLI gaming also helps future proofing the X700."

In a review for PC Magazine Brian Westover wrote, "The Lenovo Erazer X700 is a fairly good entry-level gaming desktop in its own right, but unlike competing systems, it also boasts liquid cooling, simple overclocking, and plenty of opportunities to dip a toe into the murky waters of upgrading and tweaking PCs."
