= NeoTokyo =

- Release art
- Developer: Studio Radi-8
- Composer: Ed Harrison
- Engine: Source Engine
- Platform: Microsoft Windows
- Release: 3 July 2009 (official release); 4 July 2014 (Steam release)
- Genre: First-person shooter
- Mode: Multiplayer

NeoTokyo (stylized as NEOTOKYO°) is a multiplayer tactical first-person shooter total conversion modification of Half-Life 2 in a futuristic cyberpunk setting, created by American developer Studio Radi-8. Initially released on 3 July 2009, and later re-released for Steam on 4 July 2014, it was voted to be released through Steam Greenlight on 16 October 2012. The game presents itself in a dystopian setting, with inspiration drawn from Akira, Deus Ex and Ghost in the Shell for its art-style, music and aesthetics.

== Gameplay ==
The player fires an HRV ZR68C assault rifle at the enemy team.

NeoTokyo uses a round-based structure similar to Counter-Strike, with players only respawning between rounds. Three character classes are available, differing from each other in speed, health and available weaponry. Each class has a different auxiliary vision mode (light amplification, motion detection and thermal vision) with the two lightest classes possessing thermal and optical cloaking.

The gameplay of NeoTokyo is slow-paced and balanced towards the tactical approach, with players generally being able to dispose of each other with a single burst of concentrated fire. The map design reflects this, with most maps giving numerous opportunities for ambushes and flanking.

NeoTokyo has two game-types: Team Deathmatch (TDM), and Capture The Ghost (CTG), with the majority of maps designed for the latter. Capture The Ghost is similar to one-flag CTF, with two teams competing to pick up the Ghost (a dismembered gynoid torso) and carry it to a designated 'retrieval zone' on the other side of the map. Unlike regular CTF, a team can also win the round by eliminating the other team. The Ghost is useful for this as it allows the player carrying it (and only that player) to see the position of the still remaining enemy team members, even through walls. In-game VoIP communication and a compass allows a Ghost carrier to communicate this information to their own team. While carrying the Ghost brings great benefits to a team, there are severe downsides to picking up the Ghost. With the Ghost's exact location visible to everyone at all times, a carrier's position is instantly revealed to the enemy team. Being required to drop their primary weapon before being able to pick it up and being unable to sprint are just some of the severe disadvantages of picking up the Ghost.

== Plot ==
NeoTokyo is set in Tokyo, approximately 30 years in the future. After the failure of a proposal to alter the Japanese constitution to allow foreign deployment of Japanese soldiers, a military coup d'état is attempted by extreme Japanese nationalist factions in the Japan Self-Defense Forces. In response, the Prime Minister of Japan pools former military intelligence operatives and police officers into a sub-group of the Interior Ministry's National Security Force (NSF), called Group Six, to seek out subsequent coup plotters and uphold the law in both domestic and international soil. Immediately, rumours surface that an unknown faction in the JGSDF's special forces unit "Jinrai" is preparing for another coup attempt against the government. According to the information, the said members of this group are from Special Operations Group 43, fierce ultranationalists determined to succeed with the coup once more. The ensuing strife between these two factions sets the backdrop for the game.

== Development ==
NeoTokyo has been in development since October 2004. Originally designed as a mod for Unreal Tournament 2004 as a deathmatch game with capture points, NeoTokyo's development was later switched to Valve's 2006 Source engine, where the game was remade from scratch and released in 2009.

Ghost in the Shell and Akira were cited as main sources of inspiration behind the game's art style and cyberpunk aesthetic.

The Radi-8 team ceased development of the game soon after its release on the Steam platform, however, remaining fans have attempted multiple times to revive the game with community content. Many are full rewrites or reworks of the game, such as rewriting the game in a newer branch of the Source Engine.

== Soundtrack ==
The soundtrack of NeoTokyo was composed by Ed Harrison, and was described as "haunting" by Jeff Fleming of Game Set Watch. After being recruited from a forum, he also contributed to early sound design before focusing entirely on music. A soundtrack CD was released through CD Baby. He has since self-released the album as a free digital download.

== Reception ==
NeoTokyo was featured in the "Mod World" section of the September 2009 issue of Game Informer. The game has also been featured on gaming website Kotaku, where it was stated that the game "looks completely amazing." Bitmob called it a great mod and one of the best tactical shooters of 2009. Rock Paper Shotgun wrote: "For all its loveliness, it still another Counter-Strike-ish mod. It's competently CS-ish, sure, but I'm not much of a CS fan and its additions tended to confuse rather than enhance the experience."

It won second place for the 2008 Upcoming Mod of the Year Award. In February 2010, NeoTokyo placed third in Mod DB's competition for mod of the year.

In August 2012, Glasseater, the lead tester for NeoTokyo, placed an entry for the game in the Steam Greenlight. The game quickly became popular, ranking among the top 15 games on Greenlight. The following October, the game was approved, eventually seeing release on the Steam platform on 4 July 2014.

Since its Steam release, NeoTokyo's player count declined drastically due to a lack of servers to support the influx of players. Besides during semi-organized events on Friday each week, the game servers are generally empty. From 2020 onwards, the community has hosted biannual tournaments: "Winter Warzone" - The five vs five format at the start of the year, and "Summer Skirmish" - the three vs three format in the middle of the year. These events are broadcast on the community's twitch.tv channel, recordings of which are archived on the community's youtube channel.

== Reimplementation ==
In July 2019, Neotokyo community leader Rain began work on an open-source reimplementation of Neotokyo in the Source 2013 engine funded via Patreon. The project aimed to create a version of the game which could be independently maintained and expanded by the community in absence of the original development team, as opposed to creating a full sequel. The project was put on hold by Rain indefinitely.

As of January 16, 2025, development has restarted as Neotokyo;Rebuild, as a fork of the previous reimplementation. The current goal of the project is to achieve parity with the vanilla version of the game while resolving its major issues. The project is no longer funded via Patreon.
