= G String (video game) =

2020 video game

- Developer: Eyaura
- Publisher: Eyaura
- Engine: Source
- Platform: Windows
- Release: October 16, 2020
- Genre: First-person shooter
- Mode: Single-player

G String is a 2020 first-person shooter video game developed over roughly 14 years by Eyaura for Windows. The game is set in a dystopian cyberpunk far future North America ravaged by climate change, pollution, economic inequality and civil unrest. The player controls Myo Hyori, a teenage girl fighting to survive against the hazards posed by the totalitarian state, their corporate backers, rogue machines and the polluted landscape. Along her perilous journey she even ventures into Earth orbit a couple times.

== Gameplay ==
G String is a single-player first person shooter. It also has some surreal and survival horror elements. The player takes control of Myo Hyori an 18-year-old of Korean descent, who has both telekinesis and pyrokinesis. Mechanically, G String functions similarly to Half-Life 2, which the game's code was based upon. Almost all of the G String enemies and weapons are reskins of those in Half-Life 2. There are new additions though, such as Myo's pyrokinetic ability, a whole slew of new vehicles, the Scanmines and the Sizzlers, to name a few.

== Synopsis ==
=== Setting ===
G String is set in the far future in the fictional nation of the North American Union (the NAU for short). The NAU was formed via a merger that occurred between the United States, Canada and Mexico following a series of oil wars in the Middle East that ended in nuclear war. Set in a world utterly devastated by climate change, the Earth is on the brink of collapse. The Middle East has been devastated by the previously mentioned oil wars as well as climate change, resulting in mass migration to Europe (who has since become extremely cold as a result of climate change). Europe has become majority Muslim due to these events. Southeast Asia is also largely underwater, which has resulted in massive amounts of migration to the NAU.

As a result of climate change and mass pollution, air has become so scarce that it has become a commodity. A company by the name of Murdock Air is the largest distributor of air in the modern world, with its CEO Ted Murdock being the richest man alive (and a multi-trillionaire). Murdock Air's pyramid-shaped primary air facility is the largest manmade structure in human history. Murdock and his company reside in the NAU. The NAU is the last remaining superpower on the planet. It maintains an extremely close grasp on its citizens' lives and freedoms in order to maintain its place in the world. Religion has been banned, only digital currency is allowed, citizens are required to abide by a weekly product purchase quota, free speech is non-existent and mass surveillance is everywhere. The NAU has created an extensive police state in order to ensure that their citizens stay in line.

NATO (which the NAU is a part of and seemingly its leading member) has set up largescale colonies all throughout the Solar System. One of their largest colonies (Mars) has broken away from NATO in a recent revolution and Martian separatists are hellbent on creating a state free of NATO influence where citizens can live free in a life more akin to what the old world was. Many anti-government groups also exist on Earth and throughout the rest of the Solar System as well. The largest of these groups are the Nosumers (based on Earth), who fight primarily to oppose the NAU's centralized digital currency. As a result of recent advances in science, genetic engineering and mechanical augmentation technology have become readily available. The NAU as well as several of their allies (some corporate and some governmental) has begun to use this technology to create super soldiers to fight for them (as well as to create braindead sex slaves and clones of celebrities among other things).

=== Plot ===
The game begins in orbit above Earth, where Martian separatists are planning to ram their ship into the Interplanetary Trade Center (a much taller replica of the World Trade Center). A NATO fleet commanded by Admiral Cyd Scoble fires on them and their debris fall into Earth's atmosphere.

On Earth, within an unnamed NAU megacity, Myo is locked inside of a massive facility run by Bortz Bioengineering. During her training as a telekinetic and pyrokinetic soldier, debris from the Martian separatist ships crash into the building, giving her a window to escape.

Making her way through polluted industrial and residential landscapes, the police chase Myo. Rebels soon begin to take notice of Myo and help her as she goes by. Bortz attempts to track her but fails, and requests the help of Scoble, though Scoble dismisses Myo as a threat. Myo eventually reaches an AI detention and extermination camp, overrun by a rogue AI named LOG-9, who is leading a machine uprising against the NAU. Although it is initially friendly, Myo's casual killing of robots causes LOG-9 to turn against her. Myo destroys LOG-9 with an EMP that was implanted near the machine.

Later, Myo is contacted by a rebel hacker named Riley Verge, and Myo witnesses rebel forces detonate a nuclear bomb on the NAU's gold depot. Scoble is furious and commences an orbital bombardment, indiscriminately killing civilians as retribution. Myo escapes the bombardment and joins a massive battle between anti-government rebels and the NAU. Scoble believes that Myo must have been involved in the nuclear attack and is now dead set on killing her, though Bortz wants her alive.

Myo eventually manages to make her way into a weapons and drone manufacturing plant called "Kobi Shipyards", narrowly managing to escape it before entering the Murdock Air Pyramid itself (the largest single air production and distribution facility currently on the planet). After fighting her way through waves of NAU forces, just as the hurricane begins to make landfall and hit the building, Myo begins to escape the building via an elevator, however it breaks due to the hurricane's force and she falls down its shaft. Murdock and Scoble have struck a deal. They plan on leaving Myo alone for the rest of the hurricane in order to test her adaptability. If she gets out of hand though, they plan on taking her out. Myo manages to escape the facility and make her way out of the industrial sector as it is being hit by the hurricane, but not before she is caught in it and thrown into a canal however.

Myo soon finds her way near a massive spaceport which Riley recommends she try to break into so she can sneak aboard a ship to Mars where she can be free at last. After making her way through the spaceport, she eventually manages to sneak onto the ship. As it enters Earth's orbit, anti-NAU forces begin to attack the ship. As the ship begins to break down around her and as NAU forces begin to realize that she's on the ship, after fighting her way through them she enters an escape pod and escapes back towards Earth. Riley confused as to why she's back, tells Myo that the rebels are waging an all out war against the NAU. Warfare is occurring everywhere throughout the city. After fighting her way through waves of NAU forces alongside the rebels, she eventually is captured by them and is taken to the ITC. After a malfunction in her detainment pod, she manages to begins to make her way through the facility. Murdock narrowly escapes her but she manages to get on the top of the ITC and enters a space elevator (presumably to follow him).

Myo is then captured yet again and is taken to a space station attached to the elevator. Myo is forced to take a pill to remove her powers and she is then sent to Scoble's ship where her punishment awaits her. After meeting Scoble for the first time for a brief moment, Myo's pod breaks after rebel forces begin to attack the ship. She manages to find her way to an old Martian fighter, and takes off with it. She joins up with a fleet of anti-NAU rebels (primarily Martian separatists) to fight against Scoble and his fleet. After teaming up with them to destroy several large ships (including Scoble's although he managed to escape from it) and just as they begin to plan to make their escape, a massive ship enters the battlefield. It activates a gravity well prohibiting anyone from leaving. The pilot of the Martian separatists' head ship decides to ram their ship into the ship grounding them in order for everyone to make their escape. Myo and the rest of her compatriots attempt to flee however the blast kills Myo (and presumably everyone else on the battlefield).

Myo begins to see a series of strange patterns and visions as she passes on. After passing through several different locations, she finds herself at the bottom of a flight of stairs with a glowing white a top them. She begins to ascend them, eventually finding her way into a house of some sort. She eventually finds her way into a living room of some sort where her parents are sitting. The woman who has been giving her visions throughout the game greets Myo. She asks Myo how she thinks she did in life and that she knew her parents did well. As a series of Buddhist chants begin to fill the background, a door opens where the woman says that Myo will receive her judgement. She enters the room, seeing a massive ship floating above Earth. Murdock can be heard furious and upset about the lack of respect that he feels he gets due to the rebels' recent activities. He commands the ships to fire on Earth. As it does, the ship as Murdock's pyramid and the ITC are enveloped in a wave of light. A shofar horn can be heard as this happens. The player teleports to a white void where all of the character seen throughout the game are setting. Several TVs are laying around the void. Images from throughout humanity's history (including events that happened in the game) are playing on it. The woman who has been guiding the player throughout the whole game can be seen amongst the crowd. The player is then taken to another realm, where they are flying rapidly above the ocean as the sun sets. The game's credits music begins to play and then soon after, the game ends.

== Development ==
Eyaura began developing architectural study maps in Garry's Mod in 2006, and these maps eventually became the basis of the game. After a couple of years, she turned the maps into a mod for Half-Life 2. The project was initially called Garbage In, Garbage Out and later Slacker, before receiving the name G-String. The Half-Life 2 mod was released on Mod DB on December 21, 2011.

Eyaura initially planned to abandon the project, but kept working on it due to fan feedback, eventually turning it into a full game. G-String released in October 2020, on Steam. The A-Cup update was released on December 21, 2020, and included bug fixes and reworked level design. Soon after the release of A-Cup, another larger update (the B-Cup update) entered the works. It released on July 16, 2021, and it fixed a lot of the game's bugs and provided many other small adjustments to the game as well. The Legacy Patch came out in March 2025 which addressed some visual glitches and intends to make the 2020 release as polished as possible while the game is set to receive a major facelift in the future called the G String - Ultimate Edition.

== G String - Ultimate Edition ==
Deeply dissatisfied with how the 2020 release turned out and seeing more potential in the project Eyaura decided to overhaul and relaunch the game under the title G String - Ultimate Edition. While there is no set date for this relaunch, after several setbacks during 2024 and 2025 development is back on track. On Discord there are frequent updates regarding the progress (see link below).

The Ultimate Edition is still in development, and according to the MODDB article there are plans to make the game as updated as it can be by polishing up the visuals and adding new weapons and enemies to pre-existing maps. A few additional areas are also being added, mainly alternate paths. New scripted sequences are implemented and some of the vehicle, character and weapon models are also receiving a facelift. Upgrades made to the Source Engine have allowed Eyaura to make her game much more detailed and expansive than it was beforehand.

While the Ultimate Edition focuses only on polishing the existing game an expansion pack is being hinted at featuring new elements such as a water vehicle session before the Kobi Shipyards, major additions to the Dragon Girl chapter showcasing more luxury apartments and a few other additions to the shorter chapters.

As for the far future of the franchise design documents for a sequel entitled G-String: Off World also exist. The game would show the world from the perspective of Myo's love interest who ends up leaving Earth and gets involved in all sorts of off world adventures involving Martian Separatists, Nato Terra, and space pirates.

== Reception ==
G String has received generally positive reviews, with reviewers praising its atmosphere, themes and worldbuilding although it has received criticism for its gameplay and its storyline. ModDB awarded G String's mod version the Worldly Award for their 2012 Mod of the Year Editor's Choice competition.
