= Jailbreak: Source =

2007 video game

- Logo
- Developer: Jailbreak Team
- Engine: Source engine
- Platform: Windows
- Release: February 19, 2007 (Beta 0.1 & Beta 0.2); March 30, 2007 (Beta 0.3); May 3, 2008 (Beta 0.4); January 15, 2010 (Beta 0.6)
- Genre: First-person action
- Mode: Multiplayer

Jailbreak: Source is a multiplayer team-based first-person action video game, developed as a total conversion modification on the Valve's proprietary Source engine. The game was in beta development stages before it was abandoned, with its first public release on 14 February 2007. 0.2 followed a week later as a patch. The third major public version was released two months later on April 21, 2007. The next release was made available just over a year later, on May 3, 2008 with the latest version (0.6) being released on 15 January 2010.

The gamemode of Jailbreak has been a long-standing staple of the modding community, appearing in many different game engines over the last ten years. Originating as a Quake II modification developed by Team Reaction, the game has seen success on the GoldSrc engine, and more recently the Unreal Tournament 2003 Engine.

Jailbreak: Source was well received by mod industry critics, being praised for its originality, graphical quality, amusing executions and team based gameplay. Upon the release of Jailbreak: Source 0.4, the game acquired approximately two million player minutes per month on the Steam content delivery system. The mod is freely available to anyone who has purchased a Source-based game, such as Half-Life 2 or Portal.

The current status of this mod is unknown, as the official website is no longer available.

== Gameplay ==
Jailbreak: Source is built around two teams (robots vs dinosaurs), each with a jail in their base, when an enemy player is killed, they respawn inside the opposing teams jail, where they can either await release by their own team who are fighting to get to the release button, or escape by their own means, through devious and deadly escape routes. Once the whole enemy team is in jail, the round is won, and the losing team executed in a variety of cruel and unusual ways. The latest release of Jailbreak: Source is a near total conversion with the majority of content being custom created, including 14 custom weapons, ranging from Chainguns to Railguns.

With the release of Jailbreak: Source 0.4 came the introduction of Points and Perks, which drastically changed the focus of the gameplay toward teamwork and cooperation. The perks system was designed to allow the creation of custom classes, meaning a player could play in a Stealthy Medic role, or a fast moving Heavy weapons role, or any combination the player can think up. This change of focus encouraged more teamwork, as players need to work together to create a team that could effectively counteract the opposing teams perk system. The introduction of a Healing tool, also meant that players needed to cooperate more to ensure every team member was up to full health before assaulting the enemy jail.

The points system was also designed to reward players for their own style of play. During the release of 0.3, the team recognised that certain players were more comfortable in defending roles, but these players were not getting as many frags as attacking or mid-field players. To counteract this, a dynamic scoring system was implemented to reward players who kill enemy soldiers near to the release button, or who kill escaping prisoners.

Jailbreak: Source 0.6 introduced new two new gamemodes, King of the Hill and Deathball, the latter being a remake of Q2Pong, another popular Quake 2 mod released around the same time as the original Jailbreak. Both new gamemodes are integrated into the primary gamemode, with players needing to complete gamemode specific objectives in order to release their team.

=== Points & Perks ===
In the first three beta releases of Jailbreak: Source, the gameplay was very similar to Team Deathmatch, with frags for kills and little reward for playing the game in a tactical fashion. To rectify this, later versions of Jailbreak included a new system where players gained points for playing the game in either defensive, offensive, or attack styles. For example, players receive bonus points for defending their release button, or for escaping from Jail. Another significant change was to add a Perks system allowing players to spend their points on a combination of skills and abilities from a selection of twelve to augment their playing style. These perks included augmentations like Stealth, Double Jump, Healing, Regeneration, and Awareness. The concept was designed to allow players to create a custom class and is balanced to prevent individuals becoming overpowered as each skill has an opposing skill to combat it. For example, if the enemy team is using Stealth, then choosing Awareness will give away their position on the players HUD.

=== Teams ===
There are two teams, cops, and prisoners replacing the Rebels and Combine from previous versions. This was revealed in a special "Live" ModDB Interview New high-quality skins and models were created for each team to further define the red and blue color scheme of the mod and assist players in knowing their location within each map.

=== Maps ===
Jailbreak: Source comes with twelve maps played across three different gamemodes. Each map is a unique environment, with a common red/blue theme throughout. The map themes include an Underwater Research Station, an Elizabethan Ghost Town, a crashing Space Ship, an Arctic Base, and a Neo-Tokyo city. The maps have been built with 16 player games in mind, but can support up to 32. Some maps are mirrored exactly, whilst others are asymmetrical. Each map contains a complex escape route that requires team coordination to use such as stopping a deadly rotating fan, navigating through a haunted maze, or dodging lasers. Every map has a unique custom execution, including a Helicopter bombing run, being sucked out of an airlock, being mown down by a runaway train, or being crushed ripped apart by a Tornado. Further maps were planned for subsequent releases along with a new gamemode. In addition to the official maps, the game's community has created a map pack containing 14 new environments.

== Critical reception ==
Jailbreak: Source was voted into the Top 100 Mods of 2008 and 2009 by the users of ModDB.

The latest release attracted coverage across a range of high-profile sites, including Rock, Paper, Shotgun. Writer, Alec Meer commented that "It's just hit its 0.6 release, and the Jailbreak Team seems to be treating this as though it's the mod's first proper release. Maybe it is, and any prior memories we have of it are simply a collective hallucination, like that time when poodles took over the planet for an entire Wednesday."

Jailbreak: Source received an overall positive reception from various critics. Mod DB wrote a lengthy preview of the mod prior to the release of 0.4 describing it as "fresh and exciting", and praising it for its approach to game design by allowing a player " to play in whatever style suits you best and still have a contribution to a team win". The reviewer also commented on the environment design, "For instance, the new maps are amazing - not only do they look great but each level is like another game within itself!" finally ending by saying that the game would be a "surefire hit". Mod DB did criticize the lack of extensive custom sounds within the mod saying "Some of the HL2 sound effects are there but this does not take away from the feeling each theme creates for itself.".

The release of beta 0.4 prompted coverage of the game by Total PC Gaming in their modification news section. In their article on Jailbreak: Source, the writer described the games concept and praised it for its appearance as a "modern makeover", the writer also stated that the "team needs to work on its maps" in terms of balance, specifying that Deepcore in particular "result(s) in one team being trapped in jail while the opposition camps outside the only entrance/exit". The article finished by stating that, if tweaked, "this could be one of the best of the best multiplayer experiences in the crowded Half-Life 2 modding scene".

Jailbreak: Source 0.3 has also been featured in PC Zone UK magazine, broadly describing the game mechanics, and stating that the mod is "an interesting addition to the basic game dynamic" whilst lamenting the lack of servers upon the release of the previous version. The mod was also available to install from the demo disc.

The release of Jailbreak: Source 0.3 was also covered on Kotaku where it was cited as being "an original enough premise, at least in terms of FPS games, and because of that definitely worth a look."

In an article published by the Planet Half-Life website on the GameSpy network, IGN, staff writer Thomas "Editor321" Rogers described the game as a "unique modification with dynamic gameplay". The review was mainly positive, with the writer going on to state that "The content of the game is good, but I look forward to the different map environments the most". One of the key things criticized in the review was the points and perks system "Something I believe that holds these back from being a pinnacle part of gameplay is, they are incredibly expensive pointwise. Some of these perks cost upwards of 80 points! That's a lot of killing and capturing you have to do, which quite frankly, is really hard to do." The writers overall opinion of the game was that "Jailbreak is not a game for everyone if you're looking for realism and military tactics, look away, but if you fancy some team-based arcade action, sign right up!".
