= Fistful of Frags =

- Developer: FoF Dev Team
- Engine: Source Engine
- Platforms: Microsoft Windows, OS X, Linux
- Release: May 9, 2014
- Genre: First-person shooter
- Mode: Multiplayer

Fistful of Frags is a 2014 multiplayer Western Half-Life 2 first-person shooter mod that involves team-based or free-for-all shootouts and cooperative games against AI managed enemies. It was initially released as a mod on Mod DB on December 21, 2007, later being released on Steam for Microsoft Windows, Mac OS and Linux on May 9, 2014, with several updates subsequently adding features and maps.

== Development ==
The earliest documented signs of development began on June 18, 2007, on the modding site Mod DB. A post by "RYell", the lead developer for the game, showcased weapon models and stated that internal testing would occur during July of that year.

Two months later on August 29th, a new post would showcase the Sharps Rifle 1874 and the Henry Rifle. Concept art for one of the teams, the Desperado, and in-game screenshots of the map FoF_Tramonto were shown.

A month later on September 27th, an update was posted which highlighted new contributors, such as Sonic Valley Production who provided sound effects and Steve Mazzaro who composed the main theme and end round theme. The development showcased new weapons and gave a look into gameplay. Closed Beta had begun.

After a few months, on December 19th, the game had been announced to release in open beta on the 21st. With main features being promised including:

- Fistful of Dollars gamemode
- 13 Weapons
- Equipment and Player Customization
- Fist fighting with a stamina system and a special knockout

On December 21st, Fistful of Frags released into open beta.

After the release of the beta, the mod would gain several updates in 2008, typically addressing bugs, weapon balance and polishing other aspects of the game.

On July 21st of 2008, the game received a 2.0 update, upgrading the engine to The Orange Box's version of the Source Engine, improving hit registration and implementing motion blur from Team Fortress 2. Updates continued with bot support, new gamemodes and other changes in March 2009.

From mid-2009 to mid-2010, development was focused on a 3.0 update. Released July 28th, 2010, this update added Linux dedicated servers, changed player movement by removing stamina and sprinting.

By the mod's final update in 2012, it had been updated to include features such as:

- Dual Wield System
- New Weapons
- Weapon Models update
- Several new gamemodes

After achieving enough votes to pass Steam Greenlight in October of 2013, Fistful of Frags released as a standalone title on Steam on May 9th, 2014. Due to complications with remaking the mod in Source SDK 2013, several gamemodes were cut. With the remaining gamemodes being deathmatch and team deathmatch.

On February 6th, 2015, Fistful of Frags reached 1,000,000 Installations.

From 2014 to 2025, updates for the game usually included further polishing, tweaked gameplay balancing, new map additions and 3 Halloween updates.

== Gameplay ==
Fistful of Frags is played from a first-person perspective and contains community-run servers, typically running team-based gamemodes.

The game contains an accuracy system affected by whether the player is aiming, standing still, crouching or by the player's perks, which also affects the fire-rate and reload speed of guns. As well, the game includes a variety of weapons, ranging from melee like fists and knives, to firearms such as the Colt Peacemaker to the Henry Rifle.

In addition, crates containing various weapons and tools appear around the map, requiring money to be unlocked.

== Reception ==
PC Zone reviewed the original mod version of the game, calling its maps "well-designed, well-crafted and large." However, they criticized the game's short-ranged weapons as "underpowered," calling it "far more satisfying to play medium to long-range."

Phil Savage of PC Gamer called the game "unapologetically old-school FPS" and "worth checking out, if just for the fast and silly FPS action," but criticized it as "pretty janky in places." Christopher Livingston of the same publication awarded it "Mod of the Week," praising the dual-wielding mechanic and calling the game "a whole lot of fun."
