= Blade Symphony =

2014 video game

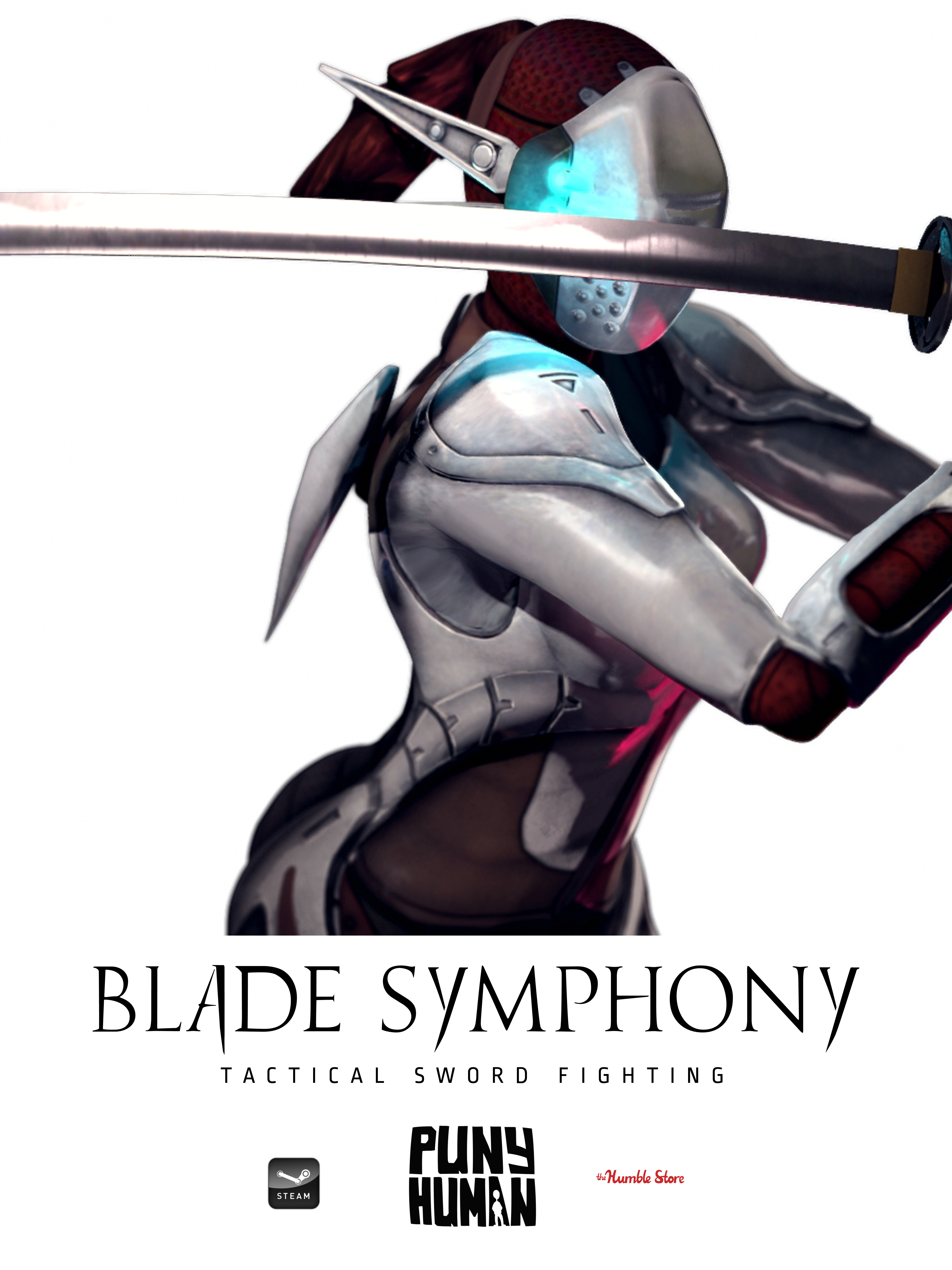
- Developer: Puny Human
- Publisher: Puny Human
- Designer: Michael Chang
- Composer: Tom Stoffel
- Engine: Source
- Platforms: Windows, Linux, OS X
- Release: Windows; May 7, 2014; Linux, OS X; September 27, 2018
- Genre: Action
- Mode: Multiplayer

Blade Symphony was a multiplayer action video game developed by American indie studio Puny Human for Microsoft Windows, OS X, and Linux. The game focuses on sword-based duelling, it is reminiscent of and inspired by Jedi Knight II: Jedi Outcast. Following a Steam Early Access release in April 2013, the game was officially released in May 2014.

== Gameplay ==
Blade Symphony is a sword fighting video game similar to the multiplayer element of Jedi Knight II: Jedi Outcast. The game does not aim for an "authentic representation" of swordplay and instead features "acrobatic, fantastical combat" with "flashy animations". Players can choose from different characters, styles and blades and compete in different modes, such as deathmatch or 2 vs 2. The game uses an Elo rating system for matchmaking.

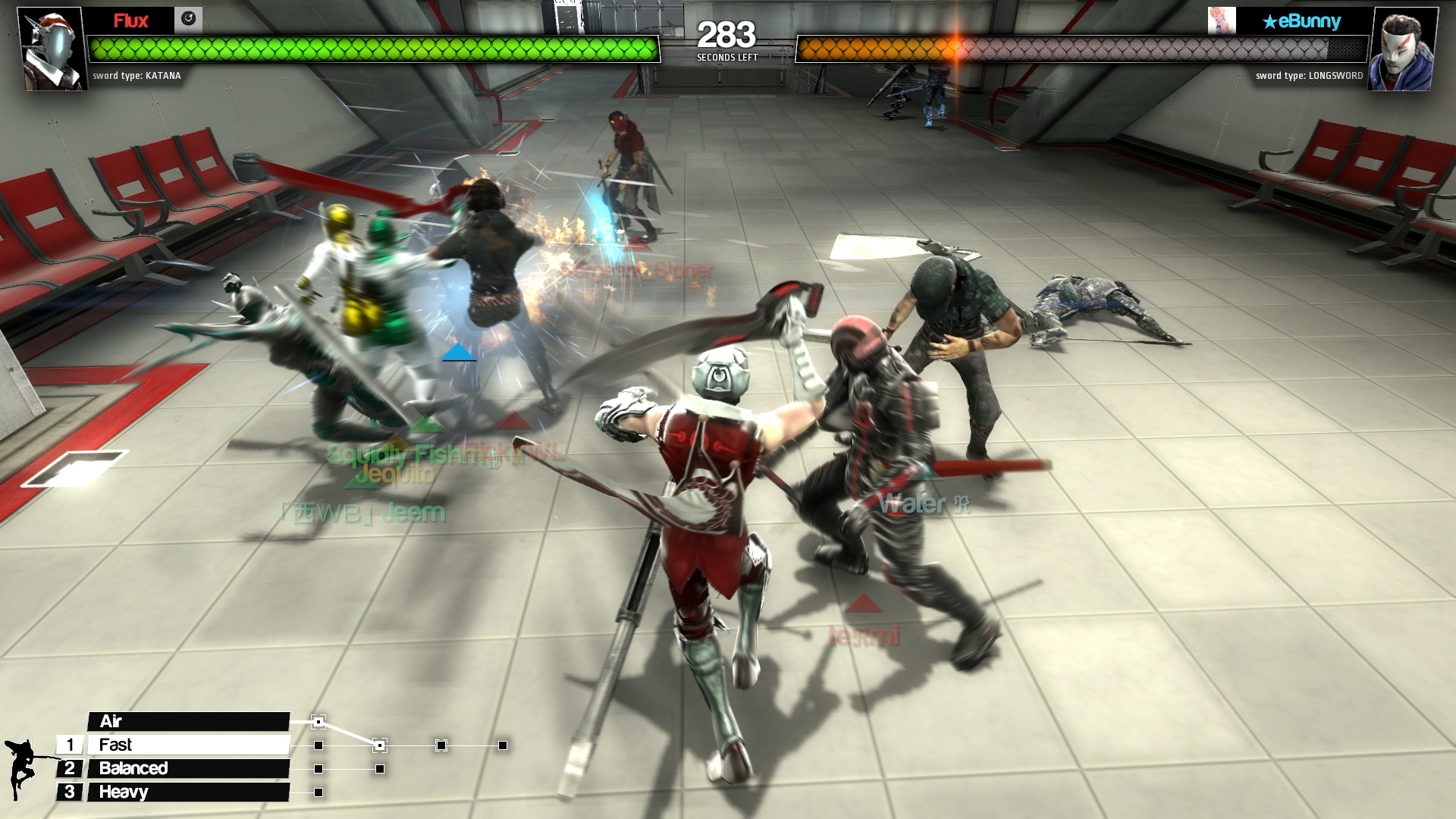
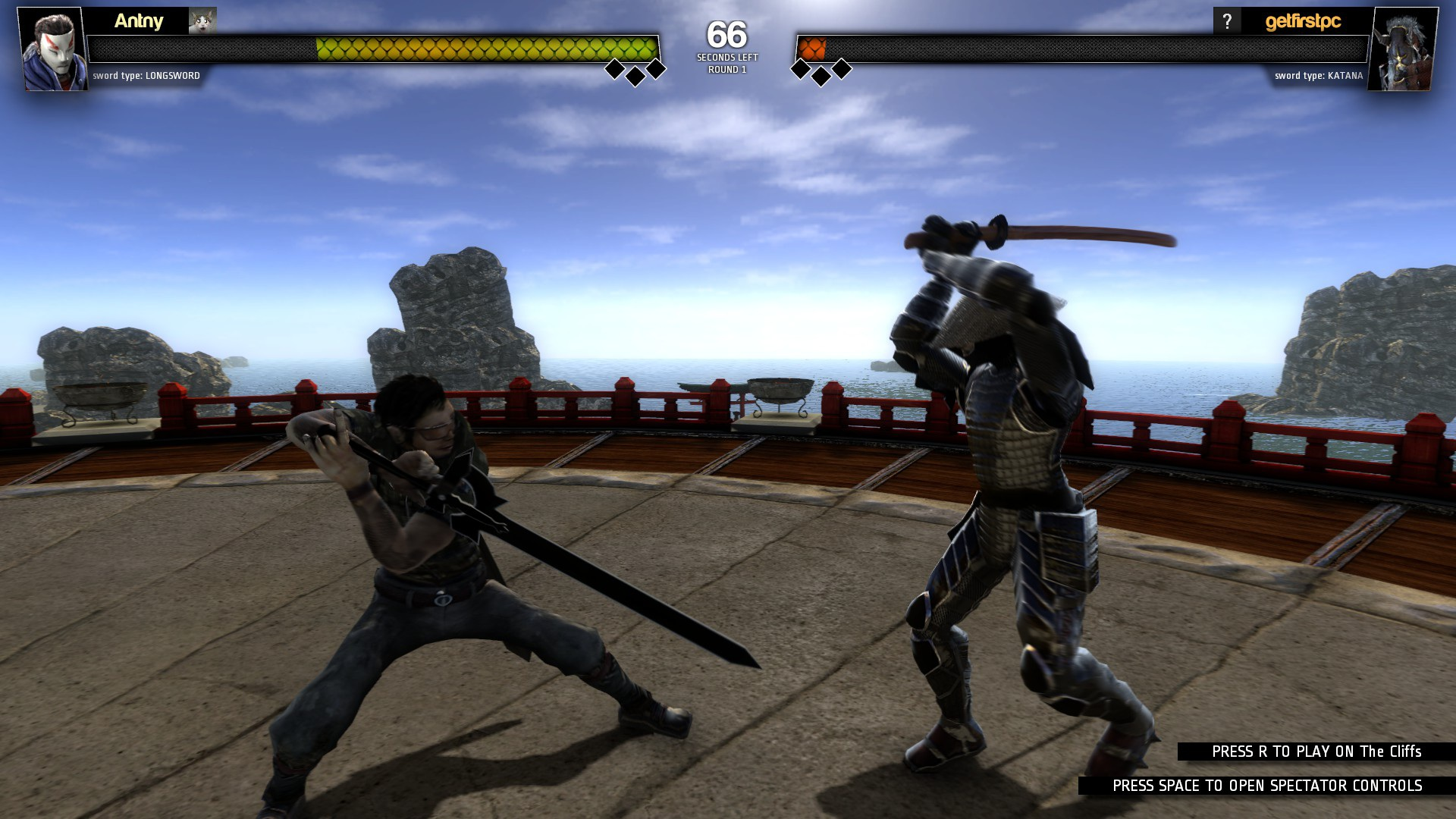
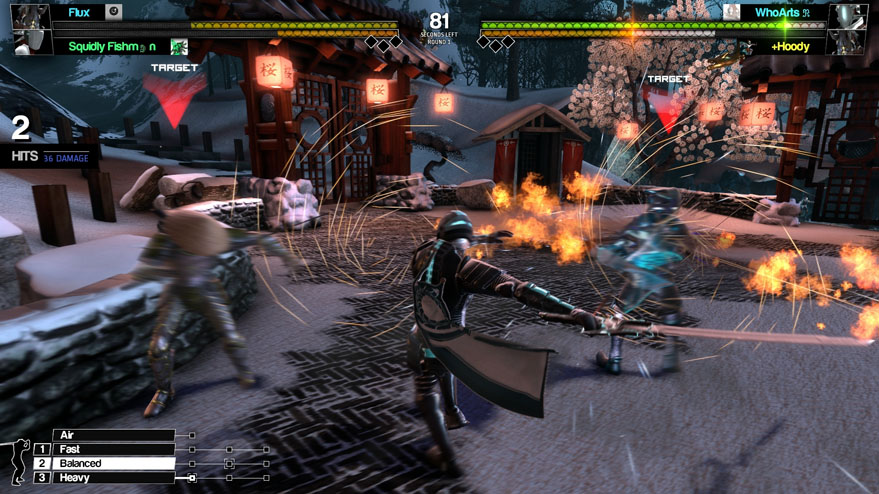
Blade Symphony features multiple characters, weapons, and modes, such as deathmatch or 2 vs 2.

== Development ==
Blade Symphony gameplay trailer

Development on Blade Symphony began in 2006 when lead designer Michael Chang and a friend needed "to scratch the sword fighting itch" they had. Chang had been a fan of Jedi Knight II: Jedi Outcast, but by 2006, its player community had dispersed. So to scratch that itch, they had to build a new game themselves.

Chang and his friend worked together on the game in the form of a Source engine mod. In 2008 his friend dropped out, but Chang continued to work on the project while trying to recruit others to join him. Eventually, the developers behind the Source engine modification Dystopia took notice and joined Chang to form the independent game developer Puny Human. Chang continued to work on the game even while taking contract work on Neal Stephenson's similarly themed CLANG video game.

In June 2011, Puny Human launched a Kickstarter campaign to raise $15,000 for a commercial Source engine license, the campaign was successful, raising $19,058. A Steam Early Access version was released in April 2013, followed by the full game in May 2014.

== Reception ==
Reception

Aggregate score
Aggregator	Score
Metacritic	72/100 (5 reviews)

Review scores
Publication	Score
Edge	8/10
GameSpot	5/10
PC Gamer (US)	85/100

Blade Symphony had a mixed critical reception, generating a score of 72 on reviews aggregation website Metacritic.

Edge praised the depth of gameplay, believing the game is deep and original enough "to stand up as a competitive game in its own right". Reviewing the game at GameSpot, Nathan Meunier noted how this depth was neatly contained in a streamlined control scheme, allowing players to "unleash a wide range of unique dizzying assaults" with "no shortage of variety [in] killer moves". Will Uhl, in his review at PC Gamer, instead found the depth shining through in the gaps between the action, where players stand off in the tense "psychological war of baiting, reacting, and examining the opponent" before the engagement.

Reviews spoke highly of the player community. Uhl noted how the "sense of honor" between players was unheard of in other games. Meunier described the community as a "dedicated and intriguing bunch", whose unpredictable and unusual strategies could lead to "plenty of humorous and interesting fights"; their "cordial and polite" nature comparing favourably to other multiplayer communities. Edge highlighted the community's culture of etiquette, such as the practice of bowing before a duel, citing "the combination of this collective roleplay with direct competition" as making the game so compulsive.

Meunier felt the game was still incomplete, giving the example of the tutorial which abruptly ends half-way through with only the promise of future chapters. He found the character choices "painfully limiting" and the process to unlock customisation options sluggish and poorly explained. Uhl too believed this lack of variety in characters and weapons is a weak point, though he found it mitigated through the game's support of user-generated content through integration of the Steam Workshop, where one could even download an enhanced tutorial.

Chris Thursten, deputy editor at PC Gamer, wrote a player diary detailing his experience learning the game, his interaction with the community, and his rise through its online ranks. He went on to recommend the game as part of the magazine's 2014 Game of the Year feature, describing his rise into the game's top 100 players as his most gratifying gaming moment of the year.
