= Pirates, Vikings and Knights II =

2007 video game

- The logo for Pirates, Vikings and Knights II
- Developer: Octoshark Studios/The PVKII Team
- Publisher: Octoshark Studios
- Engine: Source
- Platforms: Microsoft Windows, OS X, Linux
- Release: 8 August 2025
- Genre: First-person action
- Mode: Multiplayer

Pirates, Vikings and Knights II is a free-to-play multiplayer team-based first-person action video game, developed as a total conversion modification on Valve proprietary Source engine. The game was released in beta development stages, with its first public release on 1 January 2007. The first full version of the game was released on 8 August 2025.

The game is a sequel to Pirates, Vikings and Knights, a modification for Valve's earlier GoldSrc engine created by three UC Berkeley students (Garrett Moore, Matt Bishop, and Kris Hauser). The game is set around three teams, the pirates, the Vikings and the knights—each with four distinct classes and abilities—battling in a variety of game modes across various Medieval, Norse and Caribbean environments.

The game has been received positively by the industry's critics, being praised for its originality and graphical quality. By the end of February 2008, the game had acquired over 6.5 million player minutes per month on Steam.

== Gameplay ==
Pirates, Vikings and Knights II is based around three teams competing for an objective. These three teams, themed around Caribbean pirates, Viking warriors, and medieval knights, are distinct in classes and capabilities. Players can choose between one of four classes of pirates, vikings or knights, giving them access to different weapons and abilities.

Pirates, Vikings and Knights II in play: two Viking berserkers attack a pirate skirmisher.

The objectives in a Pirates, Vikings and Knights II game is defined by the game mode that is being used, There are eight game modes in total: Booty, Territory, Objective Push, Team Deathmatch, Competitive, Trinket Wars, Last Man Standing, and Duel. Booty is a capture the flag-style game mode where teams must collect or steal treasure chests distributed across the level and bring them back to their own base to activate a countdown timer to victory. The more chests a team has in its possession, the quicker the timer decreases. Territory is a king of the hill mode, in which teams fight for control of a strategic area of their surroundings. When one team holds the territory, their countdown timer activates unless they are displaced by another team. Objective Push is a more loosely defined mode, where players must complete objectives on the map to win; these objectives vary depending on the map. Team Deathmatch is a straight forward deathmatch mode where teams compete to kill as many players on the opposing teams as possible. Competitive is a variation where only two teams of two or three are allowed. Trinket Wars has each team compete to hold a trinket, with points awarded only to the player holding the trinket or teammates that are near them. Last Man Standing has each team try to eliminate all other players on the other teams, with respawns not allowed. Lastly, Duel is a mode where players fight a series of one-on-one matches, with the winner continuing on to the next match; the player with the most kills at the end wins.

Combat in Pirates, Vikings and Knights II is achieved through melee strikes, blocking and ranged attacks. Melee is performed with directed mouse movements for striking in different directions, which can be parried or blocked by other melee weapons with a corresponding mouse movement depending on the properties of the weapons involved in the fight. A successful parry leaves the attacker momentarily slowed and incapable of attacking or blocking, allowing for a counter-strike. Ranged attacks allow players to attack enemies from afar, usually at the risk of lowering their close combat defences. Ranged attacks can be blocked by players with shields.

The game's maps span a variety of realistic and unrealistic settings and environments, such as Medieval castles, Aztec temples and Caribbean islands and towns. Maps are generally built around a particular game mode configuration and are designed with eighteen players in mind. Further maps are to be added in subsequent releases. In addition to the official maps, the game's community also actively creates custom maps and content for the game.

=== Classes ===
In the initial release only one class was available to each team; eighteen classes were planned in total though the final release has only twelve, with four classes per team. The overall class structure is designed for balance, with a variety of different classes being used to create effective strategies against the opposing teams. Each class' weapons follow the theme of their team: pirate classes use a variety of sabres, cutlasses and flintlock firearms, the Vikings use battle axes and spears, and knights have access to a range of swords and bows. Every class also has access to a unique special ability, which becomes available after a player has dealt sufficient damage to foes.

Pirate players can choose a captain, a skirmisher, a sharpshooter, or a buccaneer. Captains are armed with a cutlass, a blunderbuss, and a parrot, which can be used for harassing enemies or as a distraction. Their special ability gives them the capability of firing an explosive cannonball from their blunderbuss. Skirmishers are equipped with a cutlass which they can lunge forward and impale enemies by using their special ability, a flintlock pistol and a gunpowder keg. Skirmishers move faster than most other classes, but have less health. Sharpshooters are the ranged class of the pirates, and are equipped with a long rifle for long-distance shooting, a more accurate version of the Skirmisher pistol, and a small dagger for close-quarters melee combat. Buccaneers use a sledgehammer, a hatchet, and a boarding hook which stuns opponents and drags them towards the player. Their special ability lets them breathe fire, which acts as a flamethrower that can also be charged up to shoot a fireball.

The Vikings can play as a berserker, huscarl, gestir, or bóndi. A berserker possesses a two-handed bearded axe as well as a shorter axe and a shortsword. Berserkers can use their special ability to drive themselves into a bloodlust, allowing them to move faster and attack more effectively. The huscarl is armed with a shortsword and a shield which can be used to ram enemies with their special ability, four throwing axes, and a two-handed axe. The gestir is equipped with a shield and langseax, three javelins which can be thrown at enemies, and a spear which gestirs can use their special ability on to charge enemies and knock them away. Bóndis use a seax, atlatl and flatbow which can rapidly fire up to four arrows, which can be powered up with their special ability to fire exploding arrows.

The knights have access to a heavy knight, an archer, a man-at-arms, and an assassin. Heavy knights are slow-moving but wield a longsword and can use their special ability to do a circular spinning attack. They are also equipped with a shield and a shortsword. By contrast, the archer is a fast-moving class armed with both a crossbow and a longbow, and can use their special ability to fire three flaming arrows at once from the longbow. They are also equipped with a shortsword for close combat. The man-at-arms is equipped with a halberd, a mace with a small shield, and a smaller version of the Archer crossbow. His special attack is farting that makes enemies slow and damages them at the same time. The assassin is the fastest class in the game, but also has the lowest health; she is equipped with a dagger and stiletto, a smaller version of the archer's crossbow, caltrops and a smoke bomb that briefly turns her invisible, while her special ability lets her see enemies through walls and instantly kill those with low health. Except for the heavy knight, the knights act like skirmishers; they have less health than other classes but run and attack faster in quick blows.

== Development ==
Soon after the release of Half-Life 2, Valve released a software development kit (SDK) for the game's Source engine. The SDK allows for the game to be modified in various ways, from model and texture changes, the creation of new maps to the creation of an entirely different game based on the coding framework of Half-Life 2, known as total conversion modifications. Pirates, Vikings and Knights II was developed as a total conversion modification for the Source engine, and is a sequel to Pirates, Vikings and Knights, a total conversion modification of Half-Life. The development of Pirates, Vikings and Knights II was conducted by a small team of developers, who produced the game's range of programming, art, modelling, texturing and sound. Development on the game began in 2006, and the first public beta version was released on 1 January 2007, consisting of three of the game's intended classes. Subsequent updates adjusted gameplay and balance, as well as adding additional maps. The second major beta version was released on 7 February 2008, adding three additional classes. On 14 October 2008, the team announced that version 2.3 Pirates, Vikings and Knights II would be built on the same version of the Source engine used by The Orange Box, allowing for more advanced graphical effects. In addition, version 2.3 is integrated in Valve's Steamworks program, allowing the game to be directly distributed through Steam, free to customers who own a Source engine-based game by Valve. The game left the beta phase with the release of version 1.0 on 8 August 2025.

== Critical reception ==
Pirates, Vikings and Knights II has received a positive reception from critics. In their review of the initial public beta, the custom content site Mod DB described the game as "fun and imaginative", praising it for a lasting appeal in its game modes that also serve to encourage cooperation between players. The reviewer also gave credit to the "colorful, vivid graphical style", stating that the team use of the Source engine created some "truly breathtaking views" on maps that were also well designed from a gameplay perspective. Despite praising the balanced implementation of ranged combat versus melee combat, Mod DB criticised the melee combat element as needing work, stating that it felt "repetitive and shallow", as well as expressing some concern over the balance between the classes.

The major update to the game mechanics with beta 2.0 prompted coverage of the game by PC Gamer UK in their video game modification news. In their article on Pirates, Vikings and Knights II, writer described the new classes added for this later version as exciting, as well as putting forward the view that the redesigned melee system introduced in beta 2.0 had "potential". Stating that "the rampant silliness and absurd title hide a remarkably robust and satisfying melee game", the writer even put forward that the pirate captain's parrot was "in hot competition with [Half-Life 2's] gravity gun for best video game weapon ever".

In an article published on their Planet Half-Life website on the GameSpy network, IGN echoed much of this positiveness for Pirates, Vikings and Knights II, describing the public beta 2.0 version as "well polished and balanced", noting the optimization of the game's design and the reworked melee system as effective. The reviewer also praised the graphics of the game, stating that the Source engine had been used to create "awe inspiring visuals" and describing the game's models as fantastic. The sound work in the game was also given credit, with the game's music in particular being put as "some of the best mood setting music to be had in a video game". Without any criticism of the game, the review closed stating "Pirates, Vikings and Knights II is here to stay and is setting up a very attractive shop".
