= Hunt Down the Freeman =

2018 video game

- Developers: Royal Rudius Entertainment; Operation Whiskey Freedom
- Publisher: Royal Rudius Entertainment
- Director: Berkan Denizyaran
- Composer: Paul Humphrey
- Engine: Source
- Platform: Microsoft Windows
- Release: February 23, 2018
- Genre: First-person shooter
- Mode: Single-player

Hunt Down the Freeman (Note: Stylized as HUNT DOWN THE FREEMλN) is a 2018 first-person shooter video game developed and published by indie developer Royal Rudius Entertainment through the Steam distribution platform. It is a fangame of the Half-Life series by Valve Corporation, and follows U.S. Marine Mitchell Shephard through several major events in the series' canon as he attempts to find and kill Gordon Freeman.

The game was released to a negative reception, receiving criticism for its numerous bugs, poor game design and story, and allegations of copyright infringement.

== Gameplay ==
Hunt Down the Freeman is a single-player first-person shooter in which players take control of Mitchell Shephard. The game features several mechanics from the Half-Life series, and includes several elements unusual to the series, such as the ability to aim a weapon's sight, different running mechanics, and cutscenes. It uses a parkour mechanic, which the player can use to scale pipes, crates, and other large objects.

== Plot ==
During the Black Mesa incident (Half-Life), U.S. Marine Corps Sergeant Mitchell Shephard (Mick Lauer), part of the Hazardous Environment Combat Unit (HECU), is deployed with his squad to the Black Mesa Research Facility to cover-up the incident and kill Gordon Freeman, a Black Mesa researcher resisting the cover-up operation. A person in an HEV suit, implied to be Freeman, ambushes and kills Shephard's squad members and severely wounds him. Shephard is recovered and rushed to a hospital in nearby Albuquerque, New Mexico; before he loses consciousness, Shephard is approached by the G-Man, who cryptically promises him "authority, power, and time" in exchange for killing Freeman "when the time comes".

When Shephard comes to, he finds the hospital abandoned and learns Earth is being invaded by the Combine. Shephard fights his way out of the hospital and through Albuquerque, linking up with National Guardsman Nick (Alexander Beltman) and Black Ops agent Adam (Vincent Cyr) along the way. In a transit station, they meet an Army Rangers unit led by Colonel Cue (Michael Green) and learn from a radio broadcast from the President of the United States (Keemstar) that the world's governments have surrendered to the Combine seven hours into the invasion to avoid human extinction. The group decides to flee to California to seek refuge on the Pacific Ocean, per Cue's belief that the Combine lack naval capabilities. However, their train out of New Mexico is attacked by the Combine, and only Shephard, Nick, and Adam survive.

In Nevada, the trio links up with another Rangers unit led by Lieutenant Harvey (Jonathan Benlolo) and escapes with them to the Pacific Northwest. Coming across a port, Shephard finds the container ship Avalon Vale and its captain, Roosevelt (Oliver Colton). Nick accuses Shephard of being cursed, pointing out that both of his commanding officers, Cue and Harvey, died in the escape. Roosevelt takes command of Shephard's men, but he is killed when the Combine attack the ship. Shephard is placed in charge of the survivors and forms his own private army operating out of the Avalon Vale.

Three years later, in a Combine-administered Earth, Shephard travels to City 9 in Alaska and discovers a Combine factory operated with child slaves. After negotiating with the factory's administrator, Boris (Vincent Fallow), Shephard rescues the children and brings them back to his outpost to train as soldiers. Seventeen years later, the G-Man instructs Shephard to travel to City 17 and kill Freeman. Shephard and Adam ally with the Combine under a deal with Boris, who was lifted to a high-ranking Combine position per a deal with the G-Man. Shephard and the Combine attack the Resistance base at Black Mesa East. Shepard is captured by the Resistance before being rescued by Boris' daughter Sasha (Eli Walker); however, Adam appears and kills Sasha, urging Shephard to run.

After escaping the Resistance, Shephard confronts the G-Man, who reveals that Shephard's attacker at Black Mesa was Adam, not Freeman, as part of a deal between the two. The G-Man goes on to explain that Shephard's actions have weakened the Combine, as Boris has split their forces to search for Shephard and avenge Sasha's death, thus weakening the Combine opposition Freeman faces on his own journey, which was ultimately the intended result of the G-Man's trickery. Shephard proceeds towards a factory overseen by Boris, who orders a Combine force to kill him; Shephard withstands the assault until he is rescued by Nick and returns to the Avalon Vale. Discovering that Adam has attempted to seize control over his army, Shephard confronts and kills him before directing the ship to set sail for a stranded research vessel named the Borealis.

== Development and release ==
Hunt Down the Freeman began as a modification for Half-Life 2. The game was initially pitched for crowdfunding through Indiegogo with a goal of US$100,000, though only US$12 was raised. Despite this, development on Hunt Down the Freeman commenced, and a demo of the game was released in 2016. Following the game's full release in 2018, achievements were added a year later.

== Reception ==
Hunt Down the Freeman garnered a poor critical reception. Rock Paper Shotgun expressed that the game's ideas "seem nice on paper but are executed poorly", citing several haphazard gameplay functions and storyline moments. PC Gamer described the experience as akin to "an unfinished mod project with rudimentary level design", stating that they doubted even planned bug fixes "would make up for the general quality of the FPS levels I played", although they were impressed by its initial cutscenes.

The game was panned by players, with hundreds of negative Steam reviews and critical Let's Play videos, video essays, and general criticism videos across YouTube, including continued accusations of copyright infringement. The game's developers denied these allegations, claiming that all assets were used with permission. However, they admitted that the game had numerous technical issues, attributing them to an incomplete build being released to the public by accident. They also suggested in another statement that its release was intentionally rushed to counter the already negative reputation the game had received from the community. One of the developers claimed that they and several other employees were not adequately paid for their work, with some receiving substantially less money and others receiving no payment at all. They further described the whole development process as poorly coordinated and "kind of a clusterfuck".
