= Alien Swarm =

2010 video game

- Developer: Valve
- Publisher: Valve
- Composer: Mike Morasky
- Engine: Source
- Platform: Microsoft Windows
- Release: July 19, 2010; April 20, 2017 (Reactive Drop)
- Genre: Top-down shooter
- Modes: Single-player, multiplayer

Alien Swarm is a multiplayer top-down shooter video game developed by Valve. It is a remake of a mod for Unreal Tournament 2004, and it was developed by the original team, who were hired by Valve during the course of the development process.

The original Alien Swarm was released on July 19, 2010. On April 20, 2017, an enhanced version called Alien Swarm: Reactive Drop, developed by a group of community volunteers, was released as a separate standalone game, containing numerous additional features like new co-op campaigns, a single-player mode with bots, PvP modes, support for up to eight players, Steam Workshop support, more achievements, and an expanded arsenal of weapons. Both games follow the same premise, in which each player takes the role of a space marine as part of a squad that is fighting off swarms of hostile alien parasites while attempting to accomplish various objectives.

The game was well-received by most critics, and praised for its gameplay and graphics, despite some reviewers believing it to be overly generic. The setting and gameplay was noted as being heavily reminiscent of the 1986 film Aliens.

== Gameplay ==
Alien Swarm is a top-down shooter, where four players can join a single co-operative game, the aim of which is to progress through science fiction-themed levels while eliminating waves of aliens. Players can choose from 40 different pieces of equipment, ranging from weapons like assault rifles to grenade launchers and offhand items like mines and healing beacons. The game includes persistent statistics, unlockable equipment, and achievements.

The game is class-based, with players choosing from the roles of Officer, Special Weapons, Medic, and Tech. Each class has two selectable characters, differentiated by their abilities.

Before the mission, players can change their character's loadouts and offhand items. After each mission, experience points are gained. While leveling up, the players will unlock new weapons and items to use. The mission involves the team advancing in the same general direction, often with multiple objectives to accomplish. As they advance through the level, they will find certain key points blocking the progress, which are cleared through a variety of methods, from welding to shooting to hacking. Meanwhile, many aliens (known as Swarm) will attack the players from all sides. Swarm can spawn unpredictably, and will often attack the players with mobs of enemies, as described by their name. There are many different types of Swarm, with different behaviors and attack patterns. Players can fight Swarm using many tools, including weapons, explosives, or using environmental hazards (e.g. explosive barrels).

== Plot ==
In the game's only official campaign, Jacob's Rest, a swarm of invasive aliens have taken over a colonized planet in December 2052. Marines deployed by the Bloodhound dropship arrive to search for survivors and, if need be, to destroy the colony to prevent the aliens from spreading. The task force kills a large number of not only "normal" Swarm aliens, but alien eggs, large tumor-like growths, parasites and other creatures. They soon find out that the colonists have all been killed by the alien infestation. The marines then guide a thermonuclear bomb (originally meant for excavation purposes) through the complex and activate its timer. They return to the drop ship before the bomb detonates.

== Development ==
Alien Swarm was originally a mod for Unreal Tournament 2004. The mod was Mod of the Year for GameSpy in 2004, and was a runner-up for Computer Games Magazine's 2004 "Best Mod" award, losing to Red Orchestra: Combined Arms.

A Source engine sequel to the original Unreal Tournament 2004 mod was announced in 2005, under the title of Alien Swarm: Infested. However, by late 2007, the development blog had stopped updating, leaving its status uncertain.

In July 2010 with the announcement of Alien Swarm, it was revealed that Valve had hired the team behind Alien Swarm, who had finished the mod between working on other Valve products such as Left 4 Dead and Portal 2.

An Alien Swarm software development kit (SDK) including buildable source code was released alongside the game. It is free to all users of Steam, rather than only to owners of existing Source games (as is the case with the 'mainline' Source SDK). This allows total conversion mods, which do not rely on content from other Valve games, to be free to all as well - a significant business decision that echoes the strategy of the Unreal Development Kit. The SDK and software license allows arbitrary usage and sharing but only for non-commercial purposes.

== Reception ==
Reception

Aggregate score
Aggregator	Score
Metacritic	77/100

Review scores
Publication	Score
The A.V. Club	A
Destructoid	7.5/10
GamesRadar+	3/5
HobbyConsolas	83%
Jeuxvideo.com	15/20
PC Games (DE)	81%
PC PowerPlay	9/10
Metro	6/10

Alien Swarm received "generally favorable reviews" according to the review aggregation website Metacritic.

In 2023, Rock Paper Shotgun placed it among the list of the best free PC games.

== See also ==
- List of video games derived from modifications
