= Infra (video game) =

- Developer: Loiste Interactive
- Publisher: Loiste Interactive
- Designers: Aleksi Juvani; Jukka Koskelainen; Oskari Samiola; Mikko Viitaja
- Programmer: Aleksi Juvani
- Composer: Finnian Langham
- Engine: Source
- Platform: Microsoft Windows
- Release: 15 January 2016: INFRA: Part 1; NA: January 15, 2016; EU: January 16, 2016; INFRA: Part 2; NA: September 24, 2016; EU: September 25, 2016; INFRA: Part 3; WW: September 27, 2017
- Genre: Adventure
- Mode: Single-player

Infra (stylized as INFRA) is a first-person adventure video game by the Finnish indie company Loiste Interactive. The game was developed in multiple parts. The first part was released on 15 January 2016. The second part was released as a free update on 24 September 2016. The third and final part was released as a free update on 27 September 2017.

== Gameplay ==
The player acts as a structural engineer, tasked with inspecting infrastructure in and around the fictional Scandinavian city of Stalburg. The player starts with a camera and a flashlight. Additional tools, such as keys and bolt cutters, are occasionally required to pass through certain areas.

The camera is used to photograph structural damage and lore elements, often pieces of paper. Though taking photographs is optional, it affects the game's outcome. Both the camera and flashlight require batteries, which are found scattered around the areas the player explores.

Gameplay primarily consists of solving environmental puzzles to progress through each environment and photographing any damage or relevant documents discovered along the way. During this exploration, the player will come across potentially lethal situations, such as rockfalls or electrified water, which become increasingly dangerous as the city's infrastructure begins to fail.

Some puzzles, such as choosing to fully repair a facility, are optional and can be bypassed at the cost of missed photo opportunities. To complete the game, the player must solve many mechanical and electrical puzzles and make choices to either save one's life or save the city.

== Plot ==
Infra is set in the fictional city of Stalburg, somewhere in the vicinity of the Baltic Sea, which recently emerged from a corruption scandal. The player, Markku "Mark" Siltanen, is a structural analyst and engineer. He is tasked with surveying the Hammer Valley Dam and discovers that the infrastructure is in poor condition. While surveying, he accidentally causes the water tunnels to collapse, which traps him underground. Along the way, he discovers evidence of a conspiracy between the city's business magnates that underlies many of the infrastructure failures.

Mark eventually escapes the underground. His boss, Paul, directs him to the Pitheath Water Treatment plant, to check on water pressure levels from the collapsed tunnels. He discovers that water flow has stopped, and afterward he travels via metro tunnels back to the office. However, his journey is interrupted by more collapsing infrastructure. Due to the water tunnel blockage, a high level of pressure is put on the derelict dam, causing it to burst. By the time he returns to the city, most power plants have failed and the city is flooded. He meets up with his coworkers, who travel to the Black Rock Nuclear Power Plant in anticipation of flood damage. They discover that the reactor is at risk of melting down. The player must quickly solve a final puzzle, either successfully shutting down the reactor and saving the city, or failing to prevent the meltdown. The game's epilogue is dependent on this outcome, and how many pictures were taken, both photos of structural damage and photos of evidence relating to the conspiracy.

If the player saved the reactor, but took below 50% of photographs, he will be living in a tenement with a roommate. If above 50%, he will be on vacation, and receive an offer from Paul to investigate 'Whiprock Island', a former prison. However, if the player was unable to prevent the nuclear meltdown, he will live in a rural cottage, suffering from radiation sickness; many areas of Stalburg were irradiated, resulting in thousands of deaths. Other details in the epilogue are dependent on player choices, such as optional puzzles and interactions with side characters. For example, if the player repaired all three water treatment plants, the CEO of Stalburg Water is ousted and the city's potable water becomes safe. If the player ignored the puzzles, Stalburg is facing a water crisis, bottled water is mandatory, and 40,000 citizens become ill from contaminated water.

== Development ==
Development started around 2011 after the team at Loiste Interactive was inspired by watching the 2009 documentary The Crumbling of America.

== Reception ==
Rock, Paper, Shotgun recommended purchasing the title, and Christopher Livingston from PC Gamer stated that he enjoyed the game. Nathaniel Berens of Adventure Gamers praised INFRA for its sense of immersion and puzzle mechanics, but complained about the lack of direction or feedback. Engineering.com, a trade publication, called the game "The Civil Engineering Game We've Been Waiting For."
