= Minerva (video game) =

- Minerva: Metastasis
- Developer: Adam Foster
- Composer: Joseph "ZhayTee" Toscano
- Engine: Source
- Platform: Microsoft Windows
- Release: Metastasis 1: September 2, 2005; Metastasis 2: March 12, 2006; Metastasis 3 & 4: October 1, 2007
- Genres: First-person shooter, puzzle
- Mode: Single-player

Minerva is an episodic series of single-player modifications ("mods") for Valve's Half-Life 2. The mod was created by Adam Foster. The plot and settings of Minerva are linked to Someplace Else, Foster's original map for Half-Life, and to Half-Life 2. The mod was released on Steam on April 30, 2013.

== Plot ==
=== Storyline ===
Minerva takes place in the Half-Life universe. Part of the first level is played in and around a World War II bunker, placed in an unknown, oceanic location, identified in the mod's blog as the Baltic Sea. The player assumes the role of an unnamed protagonist, hinted to be a renegade member of the Combine Overwatch, infiltrating, exploring, and ultimately destroying the Combine base on the island.

In contrast to Half-Life 2, no non-hostile characters or dialogue appear; instead, the player is aided by a mysterious guide, the eponymous "Minerva", who serves to relay story information to the player. Minerva, who is never seen, calls herself a goddess, and messages indicate that she is somewhere in Earth's orbit aboard a satellite.

The plot is progressed through radio messages from Minerva, relayed as text rather than spoken words. Minerva's communications initially are sarcastic and dismissive, and her demeanour brusque, treating the player as a data-gathering tool at her disposal. Information and storyline is revealed in short segments over the course of the chapters, often with no explanation; for example, in Metastasis she reveals that her (and therefore the player's) goal is to discover the Combine's purposes on and underneath the episode's island, but not why she considers this important or how the player became involved in the first place.

As the story progresses the protagonist fights through the base's lower levels, discovering a massive portal by which the Combine are teleporting soldiers. This shocks Minerva, who states that it leads to a world the Combine are sieging. Minerva betrays the protagonist after he sabotages the Combine's defenses, activating an orbital laser and attempting to destroy the base as she declares him a "redeemed traitor". He survives, however, and Minerva becomes apologetic, later admitting she has grown "attached" to him. She explains that the portal, wherever it may lead, could mean the difference between life and death for billions of people, hence her desperation to destroy it. She urges him to escape as she recharges the satellite's laser, as the Combine have become aware of her location and she fears retribution. With the aid of Minerva and a stolen helicopter, the protagonist fights to the surface and escapes the island just as it is annihilated by a second orbital blast.

Minerva's communications are unusual in that each is prefixed by a time/date stamp in International Date Format (ISO 8601), giving an explicit timescale to the plot. These timestamps extend to several written pieces on the series's website that give background to the story. From these and the in-game messages it is possible to construct a partial timeline of events covered in the Minerva series.

== Design ==
Adam Foster, Minerva's designer, is critical of Valve's design of Half-Life 2 maps. His belief is that game developers focus on creating gameplay friendly environments that do not work in an architectural way, "a series of unconnected boxes" says Foster, Minerva's environments are built as actual environments (with correctly proportioned structures and areas) with gameplay worked in later. This creates a more open design, in which players may, in places, navigate in multiple ways. Later locations can be seen in earlier stages of the game (along corridors or through windows for example). Map design is the mod's hallmark. While all levels are constructed primarily using Valve's resources, with few new models or textures, Foster follows his own design ideals – that of compact, well designed maps. Although the levels seem huge, as play unfolds, they are in fact very small - wrapping around to use the least space possible. This creates a sense of realism. As pointed out by Planet Half-Life: "Instead of relying on horizontally-sprawling, immense maps that stress the engine's area-capabilities to its max, Minerva maps are incredibly small. This is because of Foster's ground-breaking idea to utilize every possible area to its maximum potential, and instead of expanding horizontally, he expands vertically."

As a result, Minerva maps have a much shorter load time than maps in the original game. Foster creates the maps in layers. Once a layer is filled he moves the design downwards, which both helps to propel the storyline (a descent into a mysterious shaft) and also makes the best use of space. Visually the maps are of a high quality, with HDR lighting implemented in the latest release, and the environments match those of the official game in look and feel.

The player's Combine opposition are positioned logically, a feat given the vast number of communicating areas in each map. New adversaries do not spawn as soon as the player completes an objective but appear realistically as the episode progresses.

The first Minerva map was inspired by the fully modelled island design of the Halo: Combat Evolved level "The Silent Cartographer".

Foster describes Minerva as an "anti-modification": "The aim isn't to replace as much game content as possible; instead, it's to tell my own apocryphal story set in the Half-Life 2 universe, and to actually release something for the public to play."

The mod's companion website is available in French, German, Spanish, Italian, Polish, and Russian. Localization packs developed by the LocWorks game localization team were released in November 2008.

Foster was recruited by Valve to work on the Half Life 2: Episode Three development team, and began working for them in October 2008. Foster initially stated his intention to continue working on "Out Of Time" in his spare time. However, in a later interview with Eurogamer, Foster stated that the series would probably not continue.

Foster continues to be employed at Valve and was involved with map designs of Portal 2.

== Reception ==
Minerva has steadily grown in popularity, and was at one point a featured mod on Steam. There have also been various reviews of the mod by independent sites:

- Minerva was featured as a Mod of the Week on Planet Half-Life.
- Amped News rated it 4.5/5.
- An interview with Adam Foster in the February 2006 edition of Computer Gaming World.
- ModDB gave Minerva a Mod Of The Year 2006 Award (5th place).
- RockPaperShotgun posted an interview with Adam Foster in October 2007.
- RockPaperShotgun featured Minerva: Metastasis on the eight day of its 2007 Advent Game-O-Calendar series.
