= Nuclear Dawn =

2011 video game

- Developer(s): InterWave Studios
- Publisher(s): Iceberg Interactive
- Engine: Source
- Platform(s): Windows; Mac OS X; Linux
- Release: Windows, Mac OS X; 26 September 2011; Linux; 21 April 2014
- Genre(s): First-person shooter, real-time strategy
- Mode(s): Multiplayer

Nuclear Dawn is a hybrid first-person shooter real-time strategy multiplayer video game. It was originally announced in February 2006 as an amateur mod for the Source engine, but in April 2009 was revealed to have become Source-based project for Windows and Mac OS X. It was released on 26 September 2011.

== Gameplay ==
Gameplay screenshots
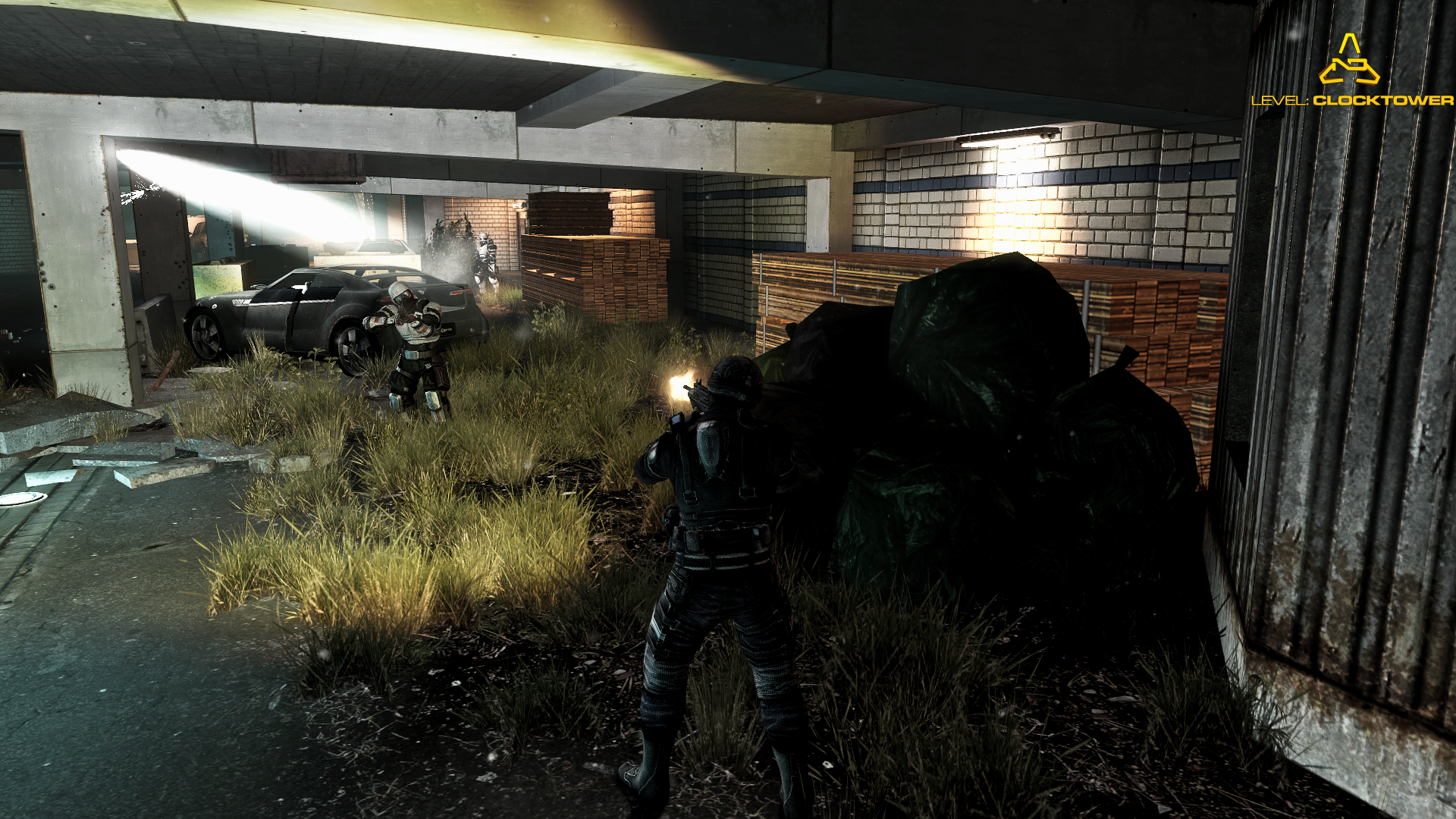
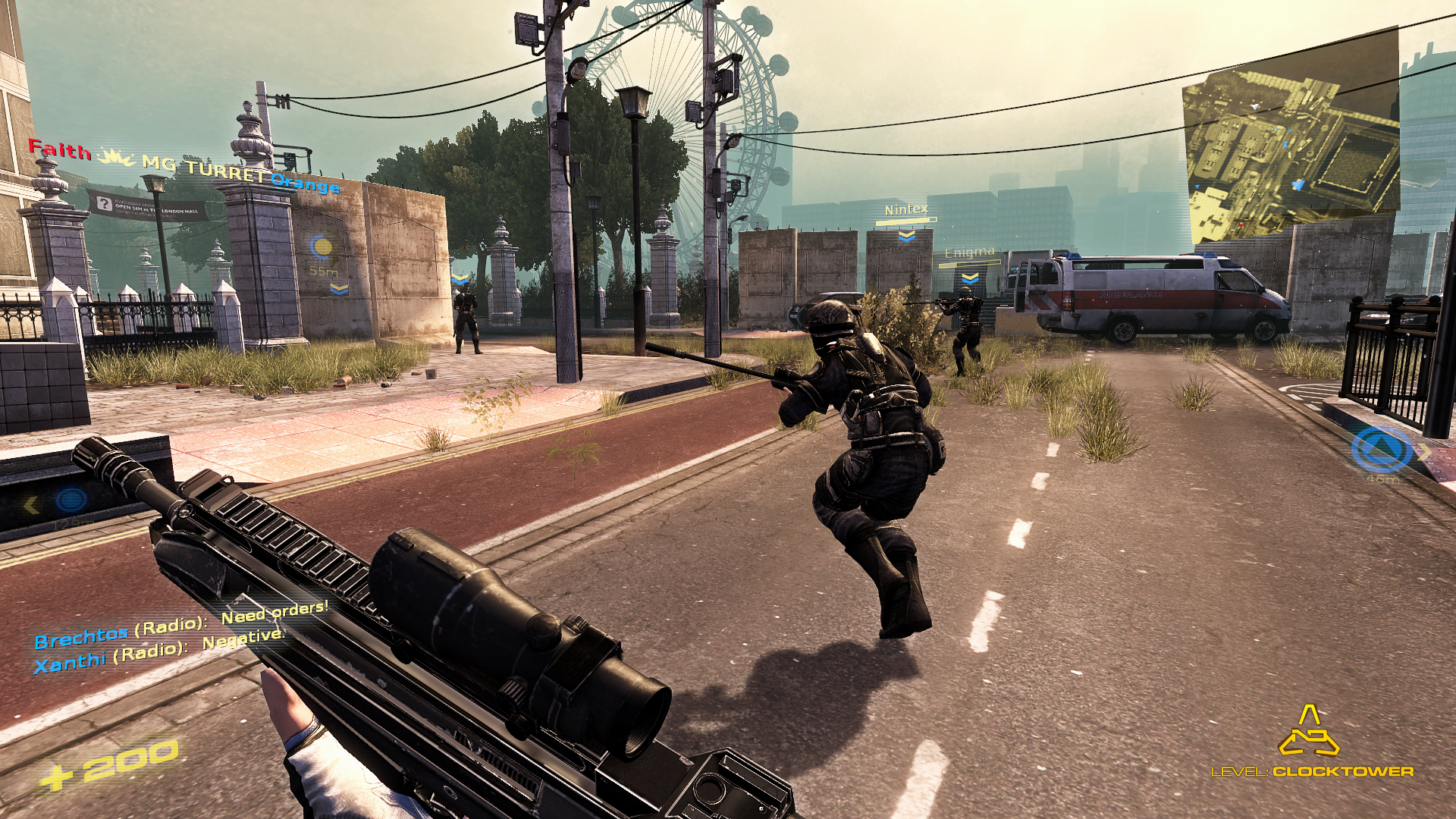
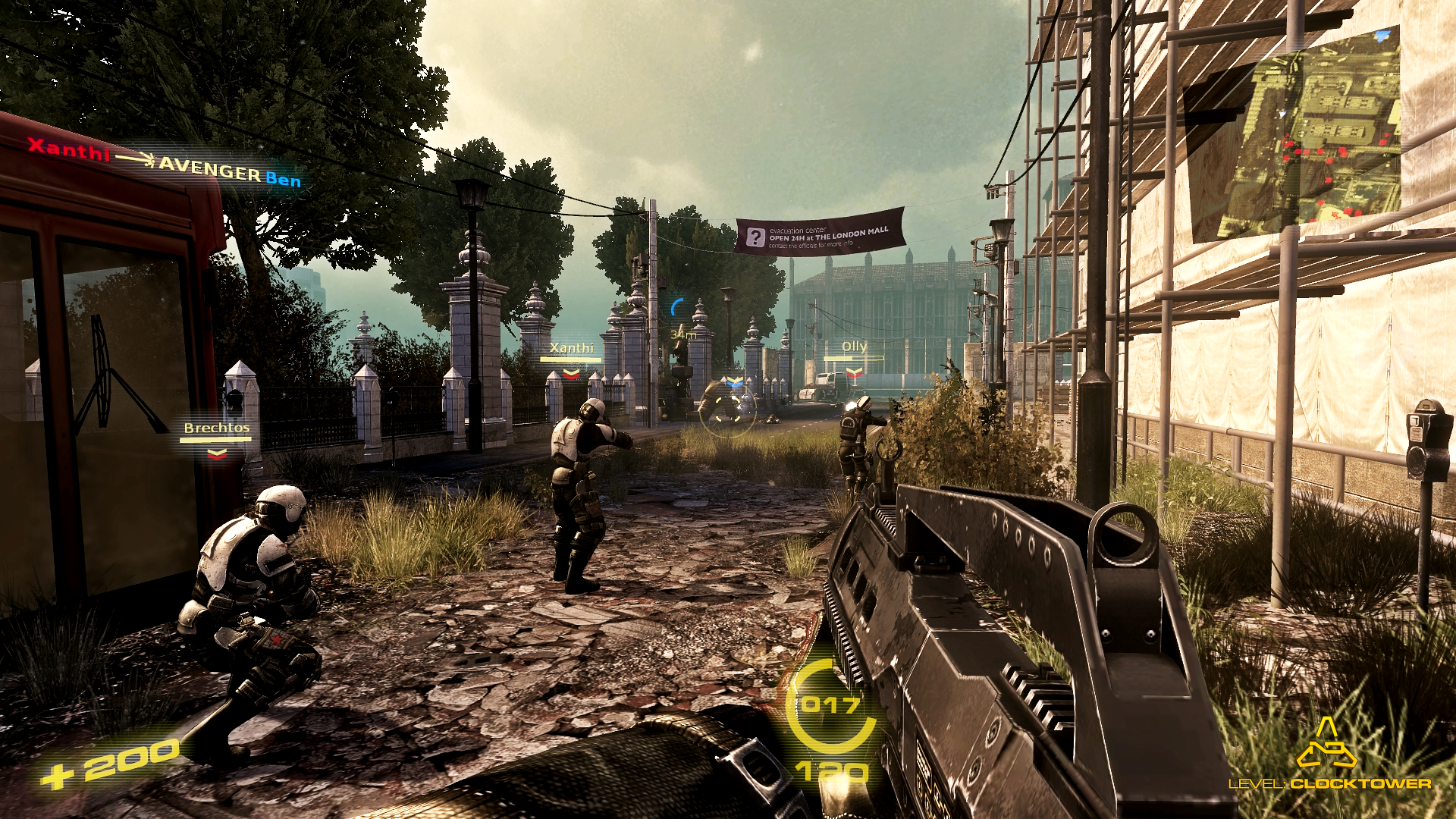

One randomly selected player on each team is a commander, who directs the team from an overhead view. This player sets up infrastructure and spawn points. The remainder are soldiers who play it as a first-person shooter. These players can choose from four classes: stealth, a quick class who can turn invisible; exo, a slow heavy weapons specialist designed to destroy enemy buildings; assault, a player versus player class who can see invisible units; and a support class who can heal teammates or repair buildings constructed by the commander. New abilities become available to each class as the commander researches technologies and erects buildings. Each side comprises 16 players. A team wins when they destroy the other side's base. There are six post-apocalyptic maps.

== Development ==
Drivable vehicles were originally planned, however this was cut due to issues.

== Reception ==
Nuclear Dawn received mixed reviews on Metacritic. PC Gamer found the perks "muddled and unclear" and disliked how there is no way to practice the commander role outside a live game. However, they called it "surprisingly deep and well-designed" and praised the map design, technology tree, and first-person elements. GameSpot praised the design, game balance, and maps, but they criticized the lack of a tutorial or solo play. They said players' experiences will likely vary according to how experienced their teammates are, ranging from "a white-knuckle tactical struggle" to "a sloppy brawl". Although they felt there were still balancing issues that needed to be fixed, Rock Paper Shotgun recommended it to fans of Savage and Natural Selection.
