= Half-Life 2: Deathmatch =

2004 video game

- Developer: Valve
- Publisher: Valve
- Series: Half-Life
- Engine: Source
- Platforms: Windows, Mac OS X, Linux
- Release: November 30, 2004: Windows; WW: November 30, 2004; Mac OS X; WW: September 30, 2010; Linux; WW: March 16, 2013
- Genre: First-person shooter
- Mode: Multiplayer

Half-Life 2: Deathmatch is a multiplayer first-person shooter video game developed by Valve. Released on Steam on November 30, 2004, it uses many of the assets from Half-Life 2 and its Source engine. It features new levels, optimized for multiplayer arena play, and a few new weapons. Also included are portions of the game's source code, which were the basis for many early Source-based multiplayer modifications. The game is the successor to the popular multiplayer component of the original Half-Life, but is offered as a separate product from Half-Life 2. Deathmatch, like Half-Life's multiplayer, does not develop any part of the plot or story of the Half-Life series.

== Gameplay ==
=== Deathmatch ===
Gravity gun in Half-Life 2: Deathmatch

Deathmatch includes some notable features such as instant respawn; weapons that have specific spawn points; and special abilities (sprint, flashlight, etc.). The aim of the deathmatch is simple: the player must kill other players to score points. If the player accidentally self-kills, they lose points. If a player is killed, they will respawn with 100 health points and the default spawn weapons, but will lose all the weapons and ammunition acquired before being killed.

The game is server based and each server contains different rules for each round therefore there is no default time limit or kill limit for each round.

=== Team Deathmatch ===
In the team deathmatch mode, players are organized in two teams, Resistance and Combine, both of them with different characters that appear exactly as they do in Half-Life 2. In the gaming aspect, team deathmatch has almost the same rules as deathmatch mode, except for:

- Instead of only one player winning the round, the team with the higher score wins.
- If friendly fire is enabled, one point is deducted each time a teammate is killed.
- If the player selected a Resistance model for his character, and they are taken to the Combine team, they will get a random model from the list of Combine models. Nevertheless, if the player dislikes that character, they are able to choose another one from the list.
- If the teams are unbalanced, the team with fewer players won't get players from the other team, (unless the server owner had 'Auto-Balance' enabled) instead, they will get new players connected to the server.

== Development ==
Half-Life 2: Deathmatch was started as a test while Half-Life 2 was being developed. Designer Adrian Finol wanted to know what it was like to use the gravity gun in a multiplayer setting, creating a build that showcased Half-Life 2 multiplayer. Scott Dalton created a map and the two played in the office, and Gabe Newell asked to be shown the product. Finol pushed for multiplayer so mod makers could access the tools to create their own levels.

Upon the release and subsequent critical reception of Half-Life 2, reviewers expressed disappointment with the game's lack of multiplayer. Two weeks after the initial release of Half-Life 2, Valve revealed and released Half-Life 2: Deathmatch on Steam. Deathmatch was released simultaneously with the Source SDK as a means of promoting game modifications built upon the platform.

Post-release, the game was supported with new maps from Valve as well as updates to the game and its engine. Valve's The Orange Box originally did not include Half-Life 2: Deathmatch, however, the game was upgraded to use the Orange Box version of the Source engine in September 2010. Valve announced a free promotional offer on January 10, 2008, which allowed NVIDIA graphics card users to download and play Half-Life 2: Deathmatch along with Portal: First Slice, Half-Life 2: Lost Coast, and Peggle Extreme.

In September 2010, the game was released via Steam for OS X. A Linux version came more than two years later, in March 2013.

In November 15, 2024, Valve released an update to Half-Life 2: Deathmatch for the first time in 3 years, fixing bugs and adding additional fixes to maps.

In February 18, 2025, the game was upgraded from 32-bit to 64-bit binaries for x64 systems, the update also included a number of minor graphical and quality-of-life fixes, along with major bug fixes.

== Reception ==
Half-Life 2: Deathmatch was well-received upon its release, with reviewers praising its inclusion of the gravity gun. GameSpot lauded the game for the Source engine's "impressive use of physics" and the available selection of maps. IGN paid similar compliments to the title, also speaking highly of the "fast play style that [Half-Life 2: Deathmatch] produces."

Multiple reviews stated that the game suffered from large amount of lag upon release, but GameSpy noted that this was remedied soon after as more servers came online.
