= Dystopia (video game) =

- Dystopia's logo.
- Developers: Team Dystopia; Puny Human
- Designers: Dustin "Teddy" Hulm; Robert "Fuzzy" Crouch; Tim "Termi" Grant
- Engine: Source
- Platform: Microsoft Windows
- Release: WW: February 25, 2007
- Genre: First-person shooter
- Mode: Multiplayer

Dystopia is a team-based, objective-driven, first-person shooter video game, developed as a total conversion modification on the Valve's proprietary Source engine. It is based on the cyberpunk literary and aesthetic genre; it is somewhat based on popular role-playing game Shadowrun, created by an amateur development team and released to the public for free. Its first playable build was released on September 9, 2005, after a year of planning and nine months of development. The first full version of Dystopia, Version 1, was released after 3 years of development on February 25, 2007.

Dystopia has been received positively from critics, with praise being given for its graphical quality, unique meatspace/cyberspace gameplay, overall polish and its representation of cyberspace. Criticisms of Dystopia were aimed at how inaccessible the game is at first, and its learning curve. The game has won several awards, including Best Mod for Half-Life 2 from the Independent Games Festival's Modding Competition.

== Setting ==
Dystopia takes place in a high-tech futuristic world spanned by computer networks. It places players into tense combat situations in its own cyberpunk universe, revolving around the conflict between two factions, the Punk Mercenaries (Punks) and the Corporate Security Forces (Corps). As either the Punks or the Corps, players battle against each other in both the physical world (known commonly as meatspace) and the virtual world (cyberspace), with actions in one having an effect on the other.

== Gameplay ==
A Punk decker jacks into cyberspace, overlooked by a Heavy Augmented Armor.

The gameplay of Dystopia is objective-based, in which both the Punks and the Corps fight against each other to complete a series of objectives within a set amount of time to win the round. The rounds are played attack vs. defence, with the attacking team (usually Punks) attempting to complete their objectives in order to progress through the level and complete their final goal. While the defending team (usually the Corps) are tasked with stopping them from completing and even attempt to push the attacking team back. This is similar to games such as Return to Castle Wolfenstein, Enemy Territory and Unreal Tournament's Assault mode. However, Dystopia's dual-layered gameplay means that it is possible to complete objectives in either the realworld (meatspace) or the virtual world (cyberspace). Many of the final objectives on maps in Dystopia require the co-ordination between both players in meatspace and players in cyberspace. Players can choose to play from one of three different character classes, Light, Medium, and Heavy Augmented Armor each with their own unique strengths and weaknesses with varying amounts of health and armor. The player is able to choose from up to four primary weapons and further customize their selected class by equipping different class based special abilities called implants.

=== Classes ===
Dystopia is class-based, and as such, each of the three classes is unique in terms of weapons, implants, and overall performance during gameplay. Classes are identical for both teams, but each class has its own individual appearance. Each of the three classes must choose from one of four primary weapons that are only available to that class, the classes are also outfitted with a semi-silenced Machine Pistol, a mêlée weapon, and a type of hand grenade.

The light class is the quickest and most agile of the three classes that a player can choose from but is also the weakest. It is the only class that is able to utilize the stealth implant and has the most implant space out of all three of Dystopia's player classes. The light class can choose from one of four primary weapons, a doubled barreled shotgun, a fast firing Boltgun (that fires electrical bolts), a charge-up laser powered rifle and a pair of automatic pistols called the Smartlocks. The Light class carries three EMP grenades, which are used to disable implants.

The medium class is the most versatile and balanced of the three classes that a player can choose from. It is the middle class out of all three of Dystopia's player classes with average speed, armour, and implant space. The medium class can choose from one of four primary weapons, an assault rifle, a semi-automatic rifle, a Grenade Launcher and a weapon that fires arcs and balls of electricity. The medium class carries two Frag grenades.

The heavy class is the slowest of the three classes that a player can choose from, but has the greatest amount of armor and health with minimal space for implants. It is generally used in either defense or to spearhead assaults on heavily defended areas. The heavy class can choose from one of four primary weapons, a rocket launcher, a minigun, an Ion Cannon and finally a weapon similar to a high-powered automatic shotgun. The heavy class carries two spider grenades, which chase after enemies.

Each of the three player classes can be customised further through an abilities system called “implants”. Implants are class based abilities that each player can choose each time they spawn; they allow the player to tweak their playing style or role within their team. Implants are separated into two categories: Headspace, implants that attach to and affect the head and Bodyspace, implants that attach to and affect the body. Each class has a different amount of HeadSpace and BodySpace available for implants; the heavier the class, the less space they have for implants. Implants are used to enhance a players natural ability such as “Leg Boosters” that allow the player to jump higher or sprint faster, "Thermal Vision" that gives the player the ability to turn on heat-signature tracking vision. They are also used to give players special abilities such as "Stealth", an active camouflage suit that gives the player the ability to sneak by unnoticed or a "Cyberdeck" implant that allows the player to Jack-In to Cyberspace.

=== Cyberspace ===
Being a cyberpunk-themed mod, Dystopia naturally has some sort of cyberspace setting. To access cyberspace, a player must equip one of two "cyberdeck" implants and find a Jack-In Point, or JIP (a sort of Brain-computer interface). Players who equip either of these implants are commonly referred to as "deckers". Cyberspace is a 3D representation of a computer network, and certain actions in cyberspace will trigger events in reality ('Meatspace').

The gameplay in cyberspace is significantly different from that of Meatspace. When a player enters cyberspace, they merely project an avatar of themselves into cyberspace. Cyberspace inherently has no gravity and little sense of up or down. Each map's cyberspace consists of links and nodes. Links are long, curved square tunnels that resemble the fibers in a fiber optic cable. Nodes are large rooms that often appear convoluted inside, and they often resemble an M. C. Escher image in complexity. While in cyberspace, the player can move between nodes on the network and launches a variety of programs against enemy deckers and terminals which control meatspace objects such as doors, security systems, cameras, phone systems, lifts and PA systems. Whilst the player is in cyberspace instead of taking damage to regular Health Points, Energy is lost when various actions are performed. When a player's energy runs out, they are ejected from cyberspace, leaving behind a cyber-shard, (a type of crystal made entirely out of the energy lost from the player whilst they were in cyberspace).

=== Maps ===
Early releases of Dystopia contained only a single map, dys_vaccine and after each update numerous official maps have been added to the game. The current total of official maps is fourteen, consisting of ten official assault styled maps and four phistball arena style maps. Each map in Dystopia consists of a series of objectives. Except in dys_detonate and dys_broadcast, Punks are always on the attack, while the Corps are defending. Phistball maps have no such objectives; instead to win a team has to score a certain number of times. Dystopia has a strong base of third party community maps created by members of Dystopia's community.

Phistball is a separate game mode introduced into Dystopia in Version 1, it was produced initially as a fun way to test out the new prediction code during closed testing of Dystopia. It was included with Version 1 after proving to be popular and fun during these closed testing sessions. Phistball takes place in arena style maps with a similar layout to that of soccer/football-style matches, with each team having a goal at opposing ends of the map and a metallic ball spawning in the centre. The two teams remain the same, with Punks versus Corps. The two teams must attempt to score a goal by pushing the ball into the opposing team's goal by using mêlée only.

== Reception ==
Dystopia has received a positive reception from critics. In their reviews of Dystopia, Planet Half-Life have described Dystopia as “a third-party modification that comes in an extremely crisp, clean-cut and well-planned package”, and praised the mod for managing “to combine great, balanced gameplay with very clean and impressive graphics”. One reviewer describes the gameplay as “similar to Unreal Tournament's assault mode” and its implants system being “similar to Deus Ex”. An early version of Dystopia, prior to its first release was featured in the modding section of PC Gamer magazine. In the feature they called Dystopia “an ambitious conversion for Half Life 2” and briefly describe Dystopia's gameplay and the cyberpunk setting, “It's like Enemy Territory [Wolfenstein] in [Judge] Dredd's Mega City One” the article goes on to describe the map dys_vaccine. Dystopia was briefly mentioned in a small paragraph in PC Poweplay's MODLIFE section. The writer opened the paragraph announcing Dystopia is a finalists in the Independent Games Festival “fingers are crossed for my friends working on Dystopia [..] who have just been announced as mod finalist in the Independent Games Festival”. The writer closes the paragraph with his congratulations “Bravo gentlemen!”. PC Powerplay also named Dystopia as one of the "most significant" mods.

The release of Dystopia Version 1 prompted PC Zone to give the mod coverage in their “Freeplay” section. In the article the writer praised it for “translating that dirty ‘hi-tech low-life’ [Cyberpunk] chestnut into a balanced multiplayer game” and goes on to compare the cyberspace in Dystopia to Tron “the Tron-like representation of cyberspace”. The article noted how the mod wasn't “instantly accessible, but it makes sense, it works and it's a lot of fun” before ending the article with “Get it before it goes commercial..” PC Zone also named it as one of their Top 5 mods of 2007, along with Minerva 3: Metastasis.

In their review of Dystopia Version 1, Planet Half-life praised Dystopia as being “the first real quality Half-Life 2 mod to come out after its launch in 2004.” The review did express some concerns of Dystopia's difficulty, “it's still not the easiest mod to get the hang of” and how new players could find the mod difficult to learn, “the chief problem with the mod is that it's difficult for new players to get a hang of all the map objectives”. The release of Dystopia Version 1 was covered on Destructoid where they described Dystopia as “the user-created mod that is everything that Microsoft's Shadowrun hopes to be”. Dystopia is the IGN editor Ferret, choice for Multiplayer mod, in IGN's Gamers Arsenal.

Two of Dystopia's developers, Dustin "Teddy" Hulm and Robert "Fuzzy" Crouch were interviewed on the Australian video game television program, Good Game. Dystopia hosted a release broadcast with DJ Wheat for the version 1.2 steamworks release. In the release party two of Dystopia's developers took part in a question and answer section with questions from the listeners and from DJ Wheat. The broadcast finished with a live broadcast of a scrim between two of Dystopia's clans. Dystopia has been downloaded over 200,000 times from popular video game file host Filefront with over 125,000 downloads from FilePlanet, 40,000+ downloads from XFire and over 10,000 downloads from FileShack.

Dystopia was featured in a blog post by Cyberpunk 2077 and The Witcher developers CD Projekt Red. The blog post titled "Recipes for kick-ass cyberpunk games" covered 3 of their favourite features from Dystopia as well as going into basic details about the game, finishing up the blog post with a link to the game's website encouraging readers to try it for themselves.

=== Awards ===
Dystopia has received various awards by gaming websites since its original release. Independent modding site Mod DB, awarded Dystopia its Originality Award in August 2005 and two months later it was awarded, Mod of the Month for the month of October. Three months after its original release, Dystopia was named the best Action Mod in Mod DB's Mod of the year 2005, also coming third in the overall competition. In both the 2006 and 2008 Mod of the Year awards Dystopia received an “Honorable Mention” and in the 2008 Mod of the Year Awards it was nominated for “Best Original Art Direction in a Total Conversion”. Other awards Dystopia has received include Best Mod for Half-Life 2 in the 2006 Independent Games Festival's Modding Competition and a Bronze Award for Best Source mod of 2007 from Steamfriends.com.
