= Source (game engine) =

Video game engine

- Developer: Valve
- Release: October 2004; 22 years ago
- Written in: C++
- Middleware: Havok
- Predecessor: GoldSrc
- Successor: Source 2
- License: Some versions of Source are source-available under a non-commercial license (for example, the Source 2013 version and the version of Source used in Alien Swarm), other versions are proprietary software
- Website: developer.valvesoftware.com/wiki/Source_SDK_Base_2013
- Repository: source-sdk-2013 on GitHub

Source (also referred to as Source 1) is a 3D game engine developed by Valve. It debuted as the successor to GoldSrc in 2004 with the releases of Half-Life: Source, Counter-Strike: Source, and Half-Life 2. Valve used Source in many of their games in the following years, including Team Fortress 2, Counter-Strike: Global Offensive, Dota 2, and the Portal and Left 4 Dead franchises. Other notable third-party games using Source include most games in the Titanfall franchise, Vampire: The Masquerade – Bloodlines, Dear Esther, The Stanley Parable and Garry’s Mod. Valve continues to support several Source games into the present day, and would incrementally release new branches of the engine until it was succeeded by Source 2 in 2015.

== History ==
Source distantly originates from the GoldSrc engine, itself a heavily modified version of John Carmack's Quake engine with some code from the Quake II engine. Carmack commented on his blog in 2004 that "there are still bits of early Quake code in Half-Life 2". Valve employee Erik Johnson explained the engine's nomenclature on the Valve Developer Community:

When we were getting very close to releasing Half-Life (less than a week or so), we found there were already some projects that we needed to start working on, but we couldn't risk checking in code to the shipping version of the game. At that point we forked off the code in VSS to be both /$Goldsrc and /$Src. Over the next few years, we used these terms internally as "Goldsource" and "Source". At least initially, the Goldsrc branch of code referred to the codebase that was currently released, and Src referred to the next set of more risky technology that we were working on. When it came down to show Half-Life 2 for the first time at E3, it was part of our internal communication to refer to the "Source" engine vs. the "Goldsource" engine, and the name stuck.

Source was developed part-by-part from this fork onwards, slowly replacing GoldSrc in Valve's internal projects and, in part, explaining the reasons behind its unusually modular nature. Valve's development of Source since has been a mixture of licensed middleware and in-house-developed code. Older versions of Source use Bink Video for video playback, however more recent releases of the Source engine use WebM videos for menu backgrounds, Full Motion Videos, and splash screens. .

=== Modularity and notable updates ===
Source was created to evolve incrementally with new technology, as opposed to the backward compatibility-breaking "version jumps" of its competitors. Different systems within Source are represented by separate modules which can be updated independently. With Steam, Valve can distribute these updates automatically among its many users. In practice, however, there have been occasional breaks in this chain of compatibility. The release of Half-Life 2: Episode One and The Orange Box both introduced new versions of the engine that could not be used to run older games or mods without the developers performing upgrades to code and, in some cases, content. Both cases required markedly less work to update its version than competing engines.

==== Source 2006 ====
A screenshot of Half-Life 2: Episode One. The high-dynamic-range rendering and Phong shading effects are evident.

The Source 2006 branch was the term used for Valve's games using technology that culminated with the release of Half-Life 2: Episode One. HDR rendering and color correction were first implemented in 2005 using Day of Defeat: Source, which required the engine's shaders to be rewritten. The former, along with developer commentary tracks, were showcased in Half-Life 2: Lost Coast. Episode One introduced Phong shading and other smaller features. Image-based rendering technology had been in development for Half-Life 2, but was cut from the engine before its release and mentioned again by Gabe Newell in 2006 as a piece of technology he would like to add to Source to implement support for much larger scenes that are impossible with strictly polygonal objects.

==== Source 2007 ====
The Source 2007 branch represented a full upgrade of the Source engine for the release of The Orange Box. An artist-driven, threaded particle system replaced previously hard-coded effects for all of the games within. An in-process tools framework was created to support it, which also supported the initial builds of Source Filmmaker. In addition, the facial animation system was made hardware-accelerated on modern video cards for "feature film and broadcast television" quality. The release of The Orange Box on multiple platforms allowed for a large code refactoring, which let the Source engine take advantage of multiple CPU cores. However, support on the PC was experimental and unstable until the release of Left 4 Dead. Multiprocessor support was later backported to Team Fortress 2 and Day of Defeat: Source. Valve created the Xbox 360 release of The Orange Box in-house, and support for the console is fully integrated into the main engine codeline. It includes asset converters, cross-platform play and Xbox Live integration. The PlayStation 3 release was outsourced to Electronic Arts, and was plagued with issues throughout the process. Gabe Newell cited these issues when criticizing the console during the release of The Orange Box.

==== Left 4 Dead branch ====
The Left 4 Dead branch is an overhaul of many aspects of the Source engine through the development of the Left 4 Dead series. Multiprocessor support was further expanded, allowing for features like split screen multiplayer, additional post-processing effects, event scripting with Squirrel, and the highly-dynamic AI Director. The menu interface was re-implemented with a new layout designed to be more console-oriented. This branch later fueled the releases of Alien Swarm and Portal 2, the former released with source code outlining many of the changes made since the branch began. Portal 2, in addition, served as the result of Valve taking the problem of porting to PlayStation 3 in-house, and in combination with Steamworks integration creating what they called "the best console version of the game".

==== OS X, Linux, and Android support ====
In April 2010, Valve released all of their major Source games on OS X, coinciding with the release of the Steam client on the same platform. Valve announced that all their future games would be released simultaneously for Windows and Mac. The first of Valve's games to support Linux was Team Fortress 2, the port released in October 2012 along with the closed beta of the Linux version of Steam. Both the OS X and Linux ports of the engine take advantage of OpenGL and are powered by Simple DirectMedia Layer. During the process of porting, Valve rearranged most of the games released up to The Orange Box into separate, but parallel "singleplayer" and "multiplayer" branches. The game code to these branches was made public to mod developers in 2013, and they serve as the current stable release of Source designated for mods. Support for Valve's internal Steam Pipe distribution system as well as the Oculus Rift are included. In May 2014, Nvidia released ports of Portal and Half-Life 2 to their Tegra 4-based Android handheld game console Nvidia Shield.

=== Source 2 ===
Source 2 was announced by Valve as the successor to Source at the Game Developers Conference in March 2015. There, Valve stated that it would be free to use for developers, with support for the Vulkan graphical API, as well as using a new in-house physics engine called Rubikon. In June 2015, Valve announced that Dota 2, originally developed with Source, would be ported over to Source 2 in an update called Dota 2 Reborn. Reborn was first released to the public as an opt-in beta update that same month before officially replacing the original client in September 2015, making it the first game to use the engine. The engine had succeeded Source by the late 2010s.

== Tools and resources ==
=== Source SDK ===
Source SDK is the software development kit for the Source engine, and contains many of the tools used by Valve to develop assets for their games. It comes with several command-line programs designed for special functions within the asset pipeline, as well as a few GUI-based programs designed for handling more complex functions. Source SDK was launched as a free standalone toolset through Steam, and required a Source game to be purchased on the same account. Since the release of Left 4 Dead in late 2008, Valve began releasing "Authoring Tools" for individual games, which constitute the same programs adapted for each game's engine build. After Team Fortress 2 became free-to-play, Source SDK was effectively made open to all Steam users. When some Source games were updated to Source 2013, the older Source SDKs were phased out. The three applications mentioned below are now included in the install of each game.

There are three applications packaged in the Source SDK: Hammer Editor, Model Viewer, and Face Poser. The Model Viewer is a program that allows users to view models and can be used for a variety of different purposes, including development. Developers may use the program to view models and their corresponding animations, attachment points, bones, and so on. Face Poser is the tool used to access facial animations and choreography systems. This tool allows one to edit facial expressions, gestures and movements for characters, lip sync speech, and sequence expressions and other acting cues and preview what the scene will look like in the game engine.

==== Hammer Editor ====
The Hammer Editor, the engine's official level editor, uses rendering and compiling tools included in the SDK to create maps using the binary space partitioning (BSP) method. Level geometry is created with 3D polygons called brushes; each face can be assigned a texture which also defines the properties of the surface such as the sounds used for footsteps. Faces can also be converted into a displacement allowing for more natural shapes such as hills to be created.

Scenery objects or complex geometry can be imported as separate 3D models from the game directory. These models can also be used as physics objects or interactive props. The editor also features an in-depth logic I/O system that can be used to create complex interactive elements. Signals to trigger different responses or change the state of an entity can be sent between entities such as buttons, NPCs, intangible trigger brushes, and map props.

=== Source Dedicated Server ===
The Source Dedicated Server (SRCDS) is a standalone launcher for the Source engine that runs multiplayer game sessions without requiring a client. It can be launched through Windows or Linux and can allow for custom levels and assets. Most third-party servers additionally run Metamod:Source and SourceMod, which together provide a framework on top of SRCDS for custom modification of gameplay on existing titles.

== Source Filmmaker ==
Source Filmmaker (SFM) is a 3D animation application that was built from within the Source engine. Developed by Valve, the tool was originally used to create movies for Day of Defeat: Source and Team Fortress 2. It was also used to create some trailers for Source Engine games. SFM was released to the public in 2012.

=== Destinations Workshop Tools ===
In June 2016, Valve released the Destinations Workshop Tools, a set of free virtual reality (VR) creation tools running using the Source 2 SDK.

=== Valve Developer Community ===
In June 2005, Valve opened the Valve Developer Community wiki. It replaced Valve's static Source SDK documentation with a full MediaWiki-powered community site.

=== Academic papers ===
Valve staff have occasionally produced professional and/or academic papers for various events and publications, including SIGGRAPH, Game Developer magazine and Game Developers Conference, explaining various aspects of Source engine's development.

== Glitches ==
The Source engine is mostly known for its glitches and bugs, the most popular of which being Bunnyhop.

=== Bunnyhop ===
Bunnyhopping (otherwise known as Bhopping) is a movement exploit that stems from Quake engine, which has made its way into the Source 1 engine. It is performed via timing a jump the exact moment you land on the ground, doing so makes the engine preserve your current velocity. This exploit can also be paired with Air-Strafing to gain speed while in mid-air.

== Notable games using Source ==
List of notable games using Source
Year	Title	Developer(s)	Publisher(s)
2004	Counter-Strike: Source	Valve	Valve
2004	Half-Life 2	Valve	Valve
2004	Vampire: The Masquerade – Bloodlines	Troika Games	Activision
2004	Half-Life 2: Deathmatch	Valve	Valve
2004	Half-Life: Source	Valve	Valve
2005	Day of Defeat: Source	Valve	Valve
2005	Half-Life 2: Lost Coast	Valve	Valve
2006	Half-Life Deathmatch: Source	Valve	Valve
2006	Half-Life 2: Episode One	Valve	Valve
2006	Garry's Mod	Facepunch Studios	Valve
2006	Sin Episodes: Emergence	Ritual Entertainment	Ritual Entertainment
2006	Dark Messiah of Might and Magic	Arkane Studios	Ubisoft
2006	The Ship	Outerlight	Mindscape (EU), Merscom (NA)
2007	Half-Life 2: Episode Two	Valve	Valve
2007	Team Fortress 2	Valve	Valve
2007	Portal	Valve	Valve
2007	Dystopia	Team Dystopia, Puny Human	Puny Human
2007	Insurgency: Modern Infantry Combat	Insurgency Development Team	New World Interactive
2008	Sting: The Secret Operations	YNK Korea	YNK Interactive
2008	Left 4 Dead	Valve	Valve
2009	Left 4 Dead 2	Valve	Valve
2009	Zeno Clash	ACE Team	Iceberg Interactive, Tripwire Interactive
2009	NeoTokyo	Studio Radi-8	NEOTOKYO
2010	Bloody Good Time	Outerlight	Ubisoft
2010	Vindictus	devCAT	Nexon
2010	E.Y.E.: Divine Cybermancy	Streum On Studio	Streum On Studio
2010	Alien Swarm	Valve	Valve
2011	Portal 2	Valve	Valve
2011	No More Room in Hell	No More Room in Hell Team	Lever Games
2011	Nuclear Dawn	InterWave Studios	Iceberg Interactive
2011	Postal III	Trashmasters, Running with Scissors	Akella
2011	Dino D-Day	800 North, Digital Ranch	800 North, Digital Ranch
2012	Dear Esther	The Chinese Room	Curve Digital
2012	Counter-Strike: Global Offensive	Valve, Hidden Path Entertainment	Valve
2012	Hybrid	5th Cell	Microsoft Studios
2013	Tactical Intervention	FIX Korea	OGPlanet
2013	The Stanley Parable	Galactic Cafe	Galactic Cafe
2013	Counter-Strike: Online 2	Nexon	Nexon
2013	Dota 2 (Note: Ported to Source 2 in 2015)	Valve	Valve
2014	Blade Symphony	Puny Human	Puny Human
2014	Consortium	Interdimensional Games	Interdimensional Games
2014	Contagion	Monochrome	Monochrome
2014	Insurgency	New World Interactive	New World Interactive
2014	Aperture Tag	Aperture Tag Team	Aperture Tag Team
2014	Fistful of Frags	Fistful of Frags Team	Fistful of Frags Team
2015	Portal Stories: Mel	Prism Studios	Prism Studios
2015	The Beginner's Guide	Everything Unlimited	Everything Unlimited
2016	Infra	Loiste Interactive	Loiste Interactive
2017	Day of Infamy	New World Interactive	New World Interactive
2018	Hunt Down the Freeman	Royal Rudius Entertainment	Royal Rudius Entertainment
2020	Black Mesa	Crowbar Collective	Crowbar Collective
2020	G String	Eyaura	Eyaura
2022	Entropy: Zero 2	Breadmen	Breadmen

In addition to the games listed above, Titanfall, Titanfall 2, and Apex Legends use a custom engine derived from Source. It has been significantly modified to the point where Titanfall 2's lead engineer claimed of this engine that "there's not a lot of Source left".

== See also ==
- First-person shooter engine
- List of Source engine mods
