= Half-Life 2 =

2004 video game

- Developer: Valve
- Publishers: Valve; Electronic Arts (Xbox)
- Artist: Viktor Antonov
- Writer: Marc Laidlaw
- Composer: Kelly Bailey
- Series: Half-Life
- Engine: Source
- Platforms: Windows; Xbox; Xbox 360; PlayStation 3; Mac OS X; Linux; Nvidia Shield
- Release: November 16, 2004: Windows; WW: November 16, 2004 Xbox; NA: November 15, 2005; EU: November 18, 2005 Xbox 360; NA: October 10, 2007; EU: October 19, 2007; AU: October 25, 2007 PlayStation 3; NA: December 11, 2007; EU: December 14, 2007; AU: December 20, 2007 Mac OS X; WW: May 26, 2010 Linux; WW: May 9, 2013 Nvidia Shield; WW: May 12, 2014
- Genre: First-person shooter
- Mode: Single-player

Half-Life 2 is a 2004 first-person shooter (FPS) game developed and published by Valve Corporation. It was published for Windows on November 16, 2004, on Valve's digital distribution service, Steam. Like the original Half-Life (1998), Half-Life 2 combines combat, puzzles and storytelling, and adds features such as vehicles and physics-based gameplay. The player controls Gordon Freeman, who joins a resistance effort to liberate Earth from the alien Combine empire.

Valve developed Half-Life 2 using its Source game engine, developed simultaneously. Development lasted five years and cost US $40 million. Valve's president, Gabe Newell, set his team the goal of redefining the FPS genre. They integrated the Havok physics engine, which simulates real-world physics, to reinforce the sense of presence and create new gameplay. They also developed the characterization, with more detailed character models and animations.

Valve announced Half-Life 2 at E3 2003 with a release date of September of that year. They failed to meet the release date, leading to fan backlash. In October, an unfinished version leaked online, damaging morale and leading to further backlash.

Half-Life 2 received acclaim and won 39 Game of the Year awards. Like its predecessor, it has been cited as one of the most influential FPS games and among the greatest video games. It was ported to Xbox, Xbox 360, PlayStation 3, macOS and Linux. By 2011, it had sold 12 million copies. Half-Life 2 was followed by the free extra level Lost Coast (2005) and the episodic sequels Episode One (2006) and Episode Two (2007). In 2020, after canceling Episode Three and several further Half-Life projects, Valve released a prequel, Half-Life: Alyx.

== Gameplay ==
A screenshot of the player engaging enemy antlions

Like the original Half-Life (1998), Half-Life 2 is a single-player first-person shooter (FPS) in which the player controls Gordon Freeman. It features combat, exploration, jumping challenges, and puzzle-solving, and narrative elements conveyed through scripted sequences. Weapons include a pistol, submachine gun, shotgun, and the powerful Combine pulse rifle. With the bugbait item, enemy antlions become allies and can be called to the player or sent to attack enemies.

Half-Life 2 introduces detailed physics simulation. With the new gravity gun, players can repel objects or pull them from a distance. For example, objects can be fired at enemies, held as shields, or placed to reach new areas, and enemy grenades can be caught and thrown back. The player must also use physics to solve puzzles. Half-Life 2 also adds sections in which the player controls an airboat and a dune buggy.

== Plot ==
After the alien invasion at the Black Mesa Research Facility, (Note: As depicted in Half-Life (1998)) a multidimensional alien empire known as the Combine has conquered Earth. Approximately twenty years after being placed in stasis, Gordon Freeman is inserted into a train bound for City 17 by the G-Man (Michael Shapiro). Helped by the undercover Resistance member Barney Calhoun (Shapiro), Gordon attempts to reach the laboratory of Dr. Isaac Kleiner (Harry S. Robins) but is subdued by Combine officers. He is rescued by Alyx Vance (Merle Dandridge), who guides him to the laboratory. Kleiner's attempt to teleport Gordon to the Resistance base fails, and Gordon is momentarily teleported to the Citadel, the skyscraper headquarters of Dr. Wallace Breen (Robert Culp), the former Black Mesa administrator and the Combine's puppet ruler. Gordon uses an airboat to progress to the base via the city's canal system, eluding Combine forces.

At the base, Gordon reunites with Alyx's father, Dr. Eli Vance (Robert Guillaume), and meets Dr. Judith Mossman (Michelle Forbes). Alyx introduces Gordon to her pet robot, Dog, and gives Gordon the gravity gun. Combine forces storm the base and capture Eli and Mossman. Gordon diverts through the zombie-infested town of Ravenholm, aided by its lone inhabitant, Father Grigori (Jim French), to a Resistance outpost whose occupants provide him with a dune buggy. He drives along the coastline of depleted water levels to reach the Combine prison of Nova Prospekt, where Eli and Mossman are being held. Gordon and Alyx reunite, locate Eli, and discover that Mossman is a Combine spy. Before they can stop her, Mossman teleports herself and Eli to the Citadel. The teleporter explodes moments after Gordon and Alyx use it to escape Nova Prospekt.

Returning to Kleiner's lab, Gordon and Alyx learn that the teleporter malfunctioned and that a week has passed, during which time the Resistance has used the attack on Nova Prospekt to launch an armed rebellion against the Combine. Aided by Barney and Dog, Gordon fights his way to the Citadel. Inside, a security system vaporizes his weapons but inadvertently super-charges the gravity gun; this helps Gordon climb the tower. He is captured and taken in a transport pod to Breen's private office, near the Citadel's apex, where he and Mossman are waiting with Eli and Alyx as captives. Breen reveals that he plans to use them as leverage to negotiate with the Combine, contradicting what he had told Mossman. Angered, Mossman frees the captives and Breen attempts to escape using a teleporter. Gordon destroys the reactor and Breen falls into the abyss. Moments after the reactor explodes, the G-Man reappears and freezes time, praises Gordon's actions, and returns him to stasis.

== Development ==
Development of Half-Life 2 began in June 1999, six months after the release of the original Half-Life. It was developed by a team of 82, or around 100 people including voice actors. Valve's president, Gabe Newell, wanted to redefine the FPS genre, saying: "Why spend four years of your life building something that isn't innovative and is basically pointless? If Half-Life 2 isn't viewed as the best PC game of all time, it's going to completely bum out most of the guys on this team." Newell gave his team no deadline and a "virtually unlimited" budget, promising to fund the project himself if necessary. They used Valve's new in-house game engine, Source, developed simultaneously.

=== Setting and characters ===
Whereas Half-Life was set in a single location, the Black Mesa research facility, Valve wanted "a much more epic and global feel" for the sequel. One concept had the player teleporting between planets, which was discarded as it would make continuity between levels difficult. At the suggestion of the art director, Viktor Antonov, who was Bulgarian, the team settled on a city in an Eastern European location. In this early concept, players would start at the boarding of the Borealis, an icebreaker bound for the city. Nova Prospekt was conceived as a small rail depot built on an old prison in the wasteland and grew from a stopping-off point to the destination itself.

After observing how players had connected to minor characters in Half-Life, the team developed the characterization, with more detailed character models and realistic animation. The animator Ken Birdwell studied the work of the psychologist Paul Ekman, who had researched how facial muscles express emotion. The writer Marc Laidlaw created family relationships between the characters, saying that it was a "basic dramatic unit everyone understands" but rarely used in games. The voice cast included Louis Gossett Jr., Robert Guillaume and Robert Culp.

=== Physics and design ===
A square in City 17, showing the Source engine's lighting and shadow effects

Valve integrated the Havok physics engine, which simulates real-world physics, to reinforce the player's sense of presence and create new gameplay. To experiment, they created a minigame, Zombie Basketball, in which players used a physics-manipulating gun to throw zombies through hoops. In mid-2000, to test the physics and non-player characters, Valve built a battle between rioting citizens and police.

In late 2001, Valve began creating a showreel, hoping to demonstrate it at E3 the next year. For several months, Newell let the team work without his input so he could provide unbiased feedback, and focused on developing Steam, Valve's upcoming digital distribution service. The team presented the showreel to Newell, showcasing physics, environments such as the Borealis, and a dialogue-heavy scene with the scientist character Dr. Kleiner. Newell felt the showreel did not adequately show how the physics would affect gameplay and that the Kleiner scene was overlong. Reflecting on the feedback, Laidlaw concluded that the character drama had to support interactivity and gameplay.

In September 2002, the team completed a second showreel, featuring a buggy race along the City 17 coast, an encounter with headcrabs on a pier, an alien strider attacking the city, and a greatly shortened Kleiner sequence. In October, Newell told the team they would announce Half-Life 2 at E3 2003 and release it by the end of the year. As with the original Half-Life, the team split into "cabals" working on different levels. Designers created levels using placeholder shapes and surfaces, which then were worked on by the artists.

=== Announcement and delay ===
Valve announced Half-Life 2 at E3 2003, with demonstrations of the characters, animation and physics. The reaction was positive, and the game won the E3 Game of the Show award. Newell also announced a release date of September 30, 2003, hoping this would motivate the team. They worked long hours to meet the deadline, but by July it was clear they would miss it. Rumors spread of a delay. On September 23, Valve released a statement targeting a release for the holiday season, leading to fan backlash.

Newell had been hesitant to announce a delay without a new release date. He said later: "We were paralyzed. We knew we weren't going to make the date we promised, and that was going to be a huge fiasco and really embarrassing. But we didn't have a new date to give people either." The graphics card manufacturer ATI had arranged a promotional event on Alcatraz Island to coincide with the planned release of Half-Life 2. Unable to pull out of the event, Newell gave a prepared speech, demonstrated the Source engine, and left without addressing questions.

=== Leak ===
On September 19, the Half-Life 2 source code was obtained by a German hacker, Axel Gembe, who had infiltrated Valve's internal network months earlier. According to Gembe, he shared it with another person, who leaked the code online in early October. Fans soon compiled a playable version of Half-Life 2, revealing how unfinished it was. The leaks damaged morale at Valve and slowed development. Fans also provided Valve with the details of people involved in the leaks. In March 2004, Gembe contacted Newell, saying he was a fan and had not acted maliciously. Newell worked with the FBI to invite Gembe to a fake job interview, planning to have him arrested in the United States; however, police arrested him in Germany. In November 2006, Gembe was sentenced to two years' probation. Valve implemented new policies to protect against leaks, such as requiring journalists to attend their office to play it before release.

=== Final months ===
In 2004, the team returned after Christmas to long hours, stressful working conditions, and no guarantee that Half-Life 2, which was costing $1 million a month to develop, would be finished soon. However, Newell felt that momentum was gathering, with the team producing about three hours of gameplay per month. In March, they created the first version playable from start to finish and stopped development for a week to play through. Major changes by this point included the cutting of the Borealis, the replacement of the jet ski with an airboat, and introducing the physics-manipulating gravity gun earlier. Feedback was positive across the company. Newell recalled: "The fact that you could go from one end of the game to the other was a really big thing for us. Then we knew it just had to get better – but it was all there." After several months of bug fixes and playtesting, Half-Life 2 was completed on October 13, 2004.

== Release ==
Valve made a 1 GB portion of Half-Life 2 available for download in an encrypted format through Steam on August 26, 2004. On the day of release, Steam customers were able to pay, unlock the files, and play it immediately, without having to wait for the game to download. In retail, distribution was handled by Vivendi Universal Games through their Sierra Entertainment subsidiary.

A demo version with the file size of a single CD was made available in December 2004 at the website of graphics card manufacturer ATI Technologies, who teamed up with Valve for the game. The demo contains a portion of two chapters: Point Insertion and "We Don't Go To Ravenholm...". The soundtrack was written by Kelly Bailey. The soundtrack, containing most of the music from Half-Life 2 and many tracks from the original Half-Life, was included with the Half-Life 2 "Gold Edition" and sold separately from Valve's online store. In 2022, fans discovered that the texture used for a corpse model originated from a photograph of a corpse published in a medical textbook, leading to criticism.

=== Dispute with Vivendi ===
On September 20, 2004, GameSpot reported that Sierra's parent company, Vivendi Universal Games, was in a legal battle with Valve over the distribution of Half-Life 2 to cyber cafés. Cyber cafés were important for the gaming market in Asia, where PC and broadband penetration per capita were much lower in most territories.

According to Vivendi, the distribution contract they signed with Valve included cyber cafés. This would mean that only Vivendi could distribute Half-Life 2 to cyber cafés — not Valve through the Steam system. On November 29, 2004, Judge Thomas S. Zilly, of U.S. Federal District Court in Seattle, Washington, ruled that Vivendi and its affiliates were not authorized to distribute (directly or indirectly) Valve games through cyber cafés for pay-to-play activities according to the parties' current publishing agreement. Zilly also ruled in favor of the Valve motion regarding the contractual limitation of liability, allowing Valve to recover copyright damages for any infringement as allowed by law without regard to the publishing agreement's limitation of liability clause.

On April 29, 2005, Valve and Vivendi announced a settlement. Vivendi would cease distributing all retail packaged versions of Valve games by August 31, 2005. Vivendi was also to notify distributors and cyber cafés that had been licensed by Vivendi that only Valve had the authority to distribute cyber café licenses; their licenses were revoked and switched to Valve's. Valve partnered with Electronic Arts for the retail distribution of its games, including the Xbox version of Half-Life 2.

=== Retail editions ===
Half-Life 2 was simultaneously released through Steam, CD, and on DVD in several editions. Customers could order three versions: the" bronze" version includes only Half-Life 2 and Counter-Strike: Source, whereas the "silver" and "gold" editions also include Half-Life: Source and Day of Defeat: Source (ports of the original Half-Life and the Day of Defeat mod to the new engine). The "Gold Edition" additionally includes merchandise, such as a baseball cap, a strategy guide and a CD containing the soundtrack.

The boxed retail copies come as standard and collector's editions. The collector's edition includes a T-shirt and sample of the Prima strategy guide. Both the disc and Steam versions require Steam to be installed and active for play to occur. None of the 2004 releases came with an instruction manual, though a reference card was included to guide people through installation and setup. In September 2005, Electronic Arts distributed a "Game of the Year Edition" of Half-Life 2, including Half-Life: Source.

=== Ports ===
Half-Life 2 was released on the Xbox console by Electronic Arts in November 2005. In 2006, Valve partnered with Taito to release Half-Life 2: Survivor, an arcade game, for the Japanese market. Valve re-released Half-Life 2 as part of the 2007 compilation The Orange Box for Windows, Xbox 360 and PlayStation 3. On May 26, 2010, Half-Life 2, Episode One and Episode Two were released for Mac OS X. In 2013, Valve ported Half-Life 2 to Linux and released a free update adding support for the Oculus Rift virtual reality headset. An Nvidia Shield Tablet-exclusive port for Android was released on May 12, 2014.

=== Updates ===
Valve released a deathmatch mode, Half-Life 2: Deathmatch, in 2004. In 2005, Valve released an extra level, Lost Coast, as a free download to anyone who purchased Half-Life 2. Lost Coast acted as a technology demonstration, showcasing new lighting techniques and high-dynamic-range rendering in the Source engine.

On December 22, 2005, Valve released a 64-bit version of the Source engine for x86-64 processor-based systems running Windows XP Professional x64 Edition. This enabled Half-Life 2 and other Source games to run natively on 64-bit processors, bypassing the 32-bit compatibility layer. Newell said it was "an important step in the evolution of our game content and tools", and that it benefited greatly from the update. Some users reported major performance improvements, though the technology site Techgage found stability problems and no notable frame rate improvement. In January 2022, Valve updated Half-Life 2 with a new interface designed for its portable Steam Deck device.

External videos
- 20th anniversary documentary on Half-Life 2 by Valve

On the 20th anniversary in November 2024, Valve made Half-Life 2 temporarily free on Steam and updated it to incorporate Episode One, Episode Two and Lost Coast, improve graphics and controls, restore lost content, fix bugs and add developer commentary. Half-Life 2 reached a new peak of 64,085 concurrent players on Steam, surpassing the previous record of 16,101 in August 2021. Valve also released a two-hour making-of documentary.

=== Mods ===
Since the release of the Source engine SDK, a large number of modifications (mods) have been developed by the Half-Life 2 community. Mods vary in scale, from fan-created levels like Minerva and weapons, to partial conversions such as Rock 24, Half-Life 2 Substance and SMOD (which modify the storyline and gameplay of the pre-existing game), SourceForts and Garry's Mod (which allow the player to experiment with the physics system in a sandbox mode), to total conversions such as Black Mesa, Dystopia, Zombie Master or Iron Grip: The Oppression, the last of which transforms from a first-person shooter into a real-time strategy game.

Some mods take place in the Half-Life universe; others in completely original settings. Many more mods are still in development, including Lift, The Myriad, Operation Black Mesa, and Infinite Finality. Several multiplayer mods, such as Pirates, Vikings and Knights II, a predominately sword-fighting game; Insurgency: Modern Infantry Combat, which focuses on realistic modern infantry combat; and Jailbreak Source have been opened to the public as a beta. In September 2022, after a decade of development, fans released Half-Life 2: VR Mod, allowing Half-Life 2 to be played in virtual reality.

As part of its community support, Valve announced in September 2008 that several mods, with more planned in the future, were being integrated into the Steamworks program, allowing the mods to make full use of Steam's distribution and update capabilities. Half-Life 2 introduced a community workshop as part of their 20th-anniversary update. In 2023, Nvidia announced Half-Life 2 RTX, a collaboration with fan developers to add ray tracing and other graphical upgrades using Nvidia's Remix tools.

== Reception ==
Reception

Aggregate score
Aggregator	Score
Metacritic	96/100 (PC); 90/100 (Xbox)

Review scores
Publication	Score
1Up.com	A+
Edge	10/10 (PC)
Eurogamer	10/10 (PC); 9/10 (Xbox)
GamePro	5/5 (PC)
GameSpot	9.2/10 (PC)
GameSpy	5/5
GamesRadar+	4.5/5
IGN	9.7/10 (PC)
Maximum PC	11/10
PC Gamer (US)	98%
VideoGamer.com	10/10
The Cincinnati Enquirer	4/4
The New York Times	Positive

Half-Life 2 has an aggregate score of 96/100 on Metacritic based on 81 reviews. Sources such as 1UP, GameSpy, The Cincinnati Enquirer, The New York Times, and VideoGamer.com gave it perfect scores, and others, such as PC Gamer, IGN, GamesRadar, and Eurogamer, gave near-perfect scores. It was the fifth game to receive ten out of ten from Edge. Critics praised the graphics, physics, story and gameplay. Maximum PC awarded Half-Life 2 11 on their rating scale which normally peaks at 10, calling it "the best game ever made".

In the United States, Half-Life 2's PC version sold 680,000 copies and had earned $34.3 million by August 2006. It was the country's 17th best-selling PC game between January 2000 and August 2006. It received a "Platinum" sales award from the Entertainment and Leisure Software Publishers Association (ELSPA), indicating sales of at least 300,000 copies in the United Kingdom. Forbes reported on February 9, 2011, that it had sold 12 million copies worldwide.

In a review of The Orange Box, IGN stated that although Half-Life 2 has already been released through other media, the game itself is still enjoyable on a console. They also noted that the physics of Half-Life 2 are impressive despite it being a console game. However, it was noted that the graphics on the Xbox 360 version of Half-Life 2 were not as impressive as when it was released on the PC. GameSpot identified framerate problems on PlayStation 3 version.

Several critics complained about the required usage of the program Steam, the requirement to create an account, register the products, and permanently lock them to the account before being allowed to play, along with installation difficulties and lack of support.

=== Awards ===
Half-Life 2 earned 39 Game of the Year awards, including Overall Game of the Year at IGN, GameSpot's Award for Best Shooter, GameSpot's Reader's Choice — PC Game of the Year Award, "Game of the Year" and "Computer Game of the Year" from the Interactive Achievement Awards, and "Best Game" with the Game Developers Choice Awards, where it was also given various awards for technology, characters, and writing.

The editors of Computer Gaming World nominated Half-Life 2 for their 2004 "Single-Player Shooter of the Year" and overall "Game of the Year" awards, although it lost to Painkiller and World of Warcraft. They wrote, "Half-Life 2, everyone's default pick to win this year, is indeed a fantastic roller coaster of a ride, not as great as the original but still leagues above most other shooters."

Edge gave Half-Life 2 its top honor of the year with the award for Best Game, as well as awards for Innovation and Visual Design. It also had a strong showing at the 2004 British Academy Video Games Awards, picking up six awards, more than any other game that night, with awards including "Best Game" and "Best Online and Multiplayer". Computer Games Magazine named Half-Life 2 the fourth-best computer game of 2004 and gave it the awards for "Best Technology" (beating Doom 3) and "Best Writing", and runner-up awards for "Best Sound Effects", "Best AI" and "Best Voice Acting". The editors called it "a masterful single-player experience that plays a constant game of one-upmanship with itself".

In 2008, Guinness World Records awarded Half-Life 2 the records for "Highest-rated Shooter by PC Gamer" and "First game to feature a gravity gun". In 2009, Game Informer named Half-Life 2 the fifth-best game, writing that "Valve redefined the way first-person shooters were created". Half-Life 2 was selected by readers of The Guardian as the best game of the decade, with particular praise for the environment design. The Guardian journalist Keith Stuart wrote that it "pushed the envelope for the genre, and set a new high watermark for FPS narrative". Half-Life 2 won Crispy Gamer's Game of the Decade tournament style poll. It also won Reviews on the Run's, IGN's Best Game of the Decade and Spike Video Game Awards 2012 Game of the Decade. In December 2021, IGN named Half-Life 2 the ninth-best game of all time.

Award	Category	Recipient(s) and nominee(s)	Result	Ref.
Game Critics Awards 2003	Best of Show	Half-Life 2	Won	
Game Critics Awards 2003	Best PC Game	Half-Life 2	Won	
Game Critics Awards 2003	Best Action Game	Half-Life 2	Won	
Game Critics Awards 2003	Special Commendation for Graphics	Half-Life 2	Won	
Game Critics Awards 2004	Best of Show	Half-Life 2	Nominated	
Spike Video Game Awards 2003	Most Anticipated Game	Half-Life 2	Nominated	
Spike Video Game Awards 2004	Game of the Year	Half-Life 2	Nominated	
Spike Video Game Awards 2004	Best PC Game	Half-Life 2	Won	
Spike Video Game Awards 2004	Best First-Person Action	Half-Life 2	Nominated	
Spike Video Game Awards 2004	Best Graphics	Half-Life 2	Won	
Spike Video Game Awards 2012	Best Game of the Decade	Half-Life 2	Won	
Golden Joystick Awards 2005	PC Game of the Year	Half-Life 2	Won	
8th Annual Interactive Achievement Awards	Game of the Year	Half-Life 2	Won	
8th Annual Interactive Achievement Awards	Computer Game of the Year	Half-Life 2	Won	
8th Annual Interactive Achievement Awards	Computer First-Person Action Game of the Year	Half-Life 2	Won	
8th Annual Interactive Achievement Awards	Outstanding Innovation in Computer Gaming	Half-Life 2	Won	
8th Annual Interactive Achievement Awards	Outstanding Character Performance - Male	Robert Guillaume as Dr. Eli Vance	Won	
8th Annual Interactive Achievement Awards	Outstanding Achievement in Character or Story Development	Half-Life 2	Nominated	
8th Annual Interactive Achievement Awards	Outstanding Achievement in Animation	Half-Life 2	Won	
8th Annual Interactive Achievement Awards	Outstanding Achievement in Art Direction	Half-Life 2	Won	
8th Annual Interactive Achievement Awards	Outstanding Achievement in Game Design	Half-Life 2	Nominated	
8th Annual Interactive Achievement Awards	Outstanding Achievement in Gameplay Engineering	Half-Life 2	Won	
8th Annual Interactive Achievement Awards	Outstanding Achievement in Visual Engineering	Half-Life 2	Won	
5th Annual Game Developers Choice Awards	Best Game	Half-Life 2	Won	
5th Annual Game Developers Choice Awards	Character Design	Half-Life 2	Won	
5th Annual Game Developers Choice Awards	Game Design	Half-Life 2	Nominated	
5th Annual Game Developers Choice Awards	Technology	Half-Life 2	Won	
5th Annual Game Developers Choice Awards	Visual Arts	Half-Life 2	Nominated	
5th Annual Game Developers Choice Awards	Writing	Half-Life 2	Won	
2nd British Academy Games Awards	Best Game	Half-Life 2	Won	
2nd British Academy Games Awards	PC	Half-Life 2	Won	
2nd British Academy Games Awards	Action Game	Half-Life 2	Won	
2nd British Academy Games Awards	Sunday Times Reader Award for Games	Half-Life 2	Nominated	
2nd British Academy Games Awards	Animation	Half-Life 2	Won	
2nd British Academy Games Awards	Art Direction	Half-Life 2	Won	
2nd British Academy Games Awards	Online Multiplayer	Half-Life 2	Won	
2nd British Academy Games Awards	Technical Direction	Half-Life 2	Nominated	
Game Audio Network Guild Awards	Audio of the Year	Half-Life 2	Nominated	
Game Audio Network Guild Awards	Sound Design of the Year	Half-Life 2	Nominated	
Game Audio Network Guild Awards	Best Dialogue	Half-Life 2	Nominated	

== Sequels ==
Half-Life 2 was followed by the episodic sequels Episode One (2006) and Episode Two (2007). After canceling Episode Three and several further Half-Life projects, Valve released a prequel, Half-Life: Alyx, in 2020.
