= List of PC games (I) =

The following page is an alphabetical section from the list of PC games.

== I ==
Name	Developer	Publisher	Genre(s)	Operating system(s)	Date released
I.G.I.-2: Covert Strike	Innerloop Studios	Codemasters	Stealth	Microsoft Windows	March 3, 2003
Icewind Dale	Black Isle Studios	Interplay Entertainment	RPG	Microsoft Windows, macOS	June 29, 2000
Icewind Dale II	Black Isle Studios	Interplay Entertainment	RPG	Microsoft Windows	August 27, 2002
Identity	Asylum Entertainment, Inc.	Asylum Entertainment, Inc.	MMORPG	Microsoft Windows, macOS	November 30, 2018
Idle Champions of the Forgotten Realms	Codename Entertainment	Codename Entertainment	Incremental	Microsoft Windows, macOS	March 25, 2020
Imperator: Rome	Paradox Development Studios	Paradox Interactive	Grand strategy	Microsoft Windows, Linux, macOS	25 April 2019
Inazuma Eleven: Victory Road	Level-5	Level-5	Role-playing; Sports	Microsoft Windows	November 13, 2025
Indiana Jones and the Emperor's Tomb	The Collective	LucasArts	Action-adventure	Microsoft Windows, Mac OS X	March 26, 2003
Indiana Jones and the Fate of Atlantis	LucasArts	LucasArts	Graphic adventure	Amiga, DOS, Macintosh, FM Towns, Microsoft Windows, OS X, Linux	June 1992
Indiana Jones and the Great Circle	MachineGames	Bethesda Softworks	Action-adventure; Stealth	Microsoft Windows	December 9, 2024
Indiana Jones and His Desktop Adventures	LucasArts	LucasArts	Adventure	Microsoft Windows, Macintosh	April 1996
Indiana Jones and the Last Crusade: The Action Game	Tiertex	U.S. Gold	Action-adventure	Amiga, Amstrad CPC, Atari ST, Commodore 64, DOS, MSX, ZX Spectrum	1989
Indiana Jones and the Last Crusade: The Graphic Adventure	Lucasfilm Games	Lucasfilm Games	Graphic adventure	Microsoft Windows, MS-DOS, Amiga, Atari ST, Mac, FM Towns	July 1989
Indiana Jones and the Temple of Doom	Atari Games	NA: Mindscape; EU: U.S. Gold	Action	Amiga, Amstrad CPC, Apple II, Atari ST, Commodore 64, MS-DOS, MSX, ZX Spectrum	August 1985
Indiana Jones in the Lost Kingdom	Mindscape	Michael J. Hanson (programmer)	Puzzle	Commodore 64	1984
Indiana Jones in Revenge of the Ancients	Angelsoft	Mindscape	Interactive fiction	Apple II, Mac, MS-DOS	1987
Insurgency	New World Interactive	New World Interactive	First-person shooter	Microsoft Windows, macOS, Linux	January 22, 2014
IS Defense	Destructive Creations	Destructive Creations	Tower defense	Microsoft Windows	April 19, 2016
Island Saver	Stormcloud Games	National Westminster Bank	Action; Adventure	Microsoft Windows	May 13, 2020
Insurgency: Sandstorm	New World Interactive	Focus Home Interactive	First-person shooter	Microsoft Windows	December 12, 2018
