= Insurgency: Modern Infantry Combat =

- Developer: Insurgency Development Team
- Publisher: New World Interactive
- Series: Insurgency
- Engine: Source
- Platforms: Windows, OS X, Linux
- Release: WW: January 7, 2007
- Genre: First-person shooter
- Mode: Multiplayer

Insurgency: Modern Infantry Combat is a multiplayer tactical shooter total conversion mod for Valve's Source engine, developed by the Insurgency Development Team and published for Windows, macOS, and Linux on January 7, 2007. Set during the Iraq War, the game follows the conflict between the United States Marine Corps and the Iraqi insurgents.

Insurgency: Modern Infantry Combat was a major success, and in 2010 the mod's developers founded the company New World Interactive. A standalone sequel to the mod, Insurgency, was released in 2014.

== Gameplay ==
The game is primarily a team-based, multiplayer online shooter focused on tactical, objective-based gameplay. The player can join one of two factions: the United States Marine Corps, or the Insurgents, a group of rebels inspired by the Taliban. The factions are split into smaller squads, led by a squad leader, who can request their members to attack, defend, move into, or secure points on the map.

Each squad contains multiple limited-number character classes (such as Rifleman, Support Gunner, Engineer or Marksman), each with a different variety of weapons and equipment. The game has a pseudo-realistic portrayal of the weaponry used. There is no on-screen crosshair and the players must use the iron sights of the game's weapon model to accurately aim the weapon. Hipfiring is possible, but the free-aim system makes this difficult. Weapons are also more deadly than in most first-person shooter titles, as most rifles are capable of taking out players with one or two shots to the torso, and attempt to imitate real-life ballistics. According to their class, players can also use fragmentation grenades, smoke grenades, and RPGs.

Insurgency: Modern Infantry Combat does not feature a typical respawn system. Instead, the game makes use of a reinforcement wave system: all eliminated players respawn together, at the end of a preset timer. Waves are limited in number, therefore if a faction remains with no waves, and all surviving players are eliminated, that faction loses and their opponent wins.

== Development history ==
Insurgency: Modern Infantry Combat originated in 2002 as Modern Warfare, a Half-Life tactical shooter mod developed by Canadian Army veteran Andrew Spearin and a team of military advisors. On June 18, 2003, Modern Warfare shifted development from GoldSrc to Half-Life 2's Source engine, and was renamed to Operation: CO-IN, which would have been set in then-modern counterinsurgency operations such as Iraq War, the Yugoslav Wars, and the Chechen–Russian conflict, though the game's scope soon narrowed to focus on just the Iraqi insurgency. On July 13, 2004, Operation: CO-IN was renamed to Insurgency: Modern Infantry Combat. Jeremy Blum, founder of the Red Orchestra mod, joined the team in 2005, along with other former Red Orchestra developers.

What appears to have been the first public release of Insurgency: MIC was released on January 7, 2008, and the mod was uploaded to Steam later that year on October 2. Various updates were released in the following years, introducing new content and improvements to the game.

== Sequels ==
In 2012, New World Interactive announced they had been working on a sequel, Insurgency 2. The game was renamed Insurgency, and was published on Steam Early Access in March 2013. The game officially released on January 22, 2014.

In February 2016, New World Interactive announced a sequel, Insurgency: Sandstorm, which was published by Focus Home Interactive on December 12, 2018. As of 2024, the game is available for Microsoft Windows, PlayStation 4, Xbox One, PlayStation 5, and Xbox Series X/S.
