= Deployable Tactical Engagement System =

The Deployable Tactical Engagement System is a training device manufactured by SAAB used by the British Army. It consists of an infrared projector mounted on the SA80 and the Vektor R4, and a harness with receptors to receive the beams to simulate hits when firing blank ammunition.

== Users ==
- South Africa
- United Kingdom

== See also ==
- Small Arms Weapons Effects Simulator
- Realistic Engagement And Combat Training System
- Airsoft
- Quasar
- Military exercise
- Paintball
- Opposing force
