= Day of Infamy (video game) =

2017 tactical shooter video game

- Developer: New World Interactive
- Publisher: New World Interactive
- Engine: Source
- Platforms: Microsoft Windows macOS; Linux
- Release: March 23, 2017
- Genres: First-person shooter, action, strategy
- Modes: Multiplayer, single-player

Day of Infamy is a multiplayer tactical first-person shooter video game developed and published by New World Interactive set during the events of the European Theatre of World War II. It is a spinoff of New World Interactive's previous title Insurgency, from which it takes most of its gameplay elements. Day of Infamy uses Valve's Source Engine.

The game was released for Microsoft Windows, macOS, and Linux on March 23, 2017. The final update for the game was released on December 21, 2017, after which official support and community modding efforts died down. Insurgency: Sandstorm, released in 2018 by New World Interactive as a sequel to Insurgency, contains many of the features introduced in Day of Infamy, and can be considered its spiritual successor.

== Gameplay ==
Day of Infamy draws much of its gameplay from Insurgency. Day of Infamy lacks a crosshair, HUD map, and on certain servers, a kill feed. Players can quickly die from very few shots. Respawns occur in waves to simulate reinforcements (when the team has these waves available). Each player gets a number of Supply Points they can spend on weapons and gear for their soldier, a class in every team to select and a weight system which affects stamina and speed. Each team receives a certain number of reinforcement waves dependent on the game mode, and gains supply points by completing map objectives and killing players from the opposing team.

Players are divided into two teams: Allies (United States Army, British Army, Canadian Army, Second Australian Imperial Force, British Indian Army) and Axis (Wehrmacht, Waffen-SS). Each map selects one of these default armies per team for players to use, though certain military units can be bought using real money and used on maps where they were actually deployed (for example, the map "Dog Red", set on Omaha Beach, pits the U.S. Army against the Wehrmacht and SS; for the Allies, the 1st Infantry Division can be purchased and used on this map).

There are nine classes players can choose from: Rifleman, Assault, Support, Flamethrower, Engineer, Machinegunner, Sniper, Radioman, and Officer. Each class has unique armaments, equipment, and attachments to suit their roles, like long-range scopes for Sniper, submachine guns for Assault, or deployable ammunition packs for Support. The Officer and Radioman classes are designed to work together to request fire support, a teamwork-oriented feature introduced in this game where the Officer can request special assistance such as artillery, aircraft strafes, or dive bomber strikes.

=== Game modes ===
==== Battles/Casual ====
- Frontline: Both teams must fight over and capture five objectives on the map. Each team has a Radio at their base, which can be destroyed by the enemy. Teams gain or lose reinforcement waves by completing or losing objectives. The match concludes if a team holds the most objectives by the end of the time limit, destroys the enemy's Radio, or depletes the enemy's reinforcements.
- Invasion: The attacking team must sequentially advance through objectives that are held by the defending team, which has more reinforcement waves. The defending team's final objective has a HQ Radio. Once this objective is active, they lose their reinforcement waves and must protect the Radio. The attacking team wins if they destroy the enemy's Radio or eliminate the enemy team. The defending team wins if they manage to hold the line or deplete the attacking team's reinforcements.
- Offensive: Invasion, except the defending team has infinite reinforcements. However, they must regroup at their spawn point to reinforce their team, which can allow the attacking team to advance. The attacking team is unchanged.
- Liberation: Similar to Frontline, there are five objectives that must be captured. However, they may be captured in any order. Bonuses are given for taking objectives behind enemy lines. The match concludes if a team holds the most objectives by the end of the time limit or depletes the enemy's reinforcements.

==== Special Assignments ====
- Intel: A capture the flag mode, where the attacking team must capture an intelligence folder from the defending team, who must stop them and protect the folder.
- Firefight: Similar to Liberation, there are five objectives that may be captured in any order. However, dead players can only respawn if their team has captured an objective. The match concludes if a team holds the most objectives by the end of the time limit or depletes the enemy's reinforcements.
- Sabotage: The attacking team must destroy targets on the map (specifically anti-aircraft weapons and fuel depots), while the defending team must stop them and protect the targets. The attacking team wins if they destroy all of the targets. The defending team wins if they successfully protect the targets.

==== Co-op ====
- Stronghold: Similar to Invasion, except all players are placed on the attacking team; the defending team consists entirely of bots. Players must sequentially advance through objectives that are held by the defending team, then destroy their Radio.
- Raid: Similar to Sabotage, except all players are placed on the attacking team; the defending team consists entirely of bots. Players must destroy targets on the map while repelling the defending team.
- Entrenchment: Similar to Offensive, except all players are placed on the defending team; the attacking team consists entirely of bots. Players must hold certain positions on the map while keeping the attacking team at bay for as long as possible.

== Development ==
Day of Infamy began as a free mod developed for their previous title, Insurgency. The mod was released on the Steam Workshop on January 16, 2016, and was updated through May 26, 2016. A closed alpha was released on July 19, 2016. Day of Infamy was approved for release on Steam's Early Access program on July 28, 2016. The game entered beta phase on December 22, 2016, and left Early Access on March 23, 2017. The final update was released on December 21, 2017.

== Reception ==
Day of Infamy gained an aggregate score of 77/100 on Metacritic.

Patrick Lofgren of GamingBolt gave the game a 7/10 and praised the game for its respawn system, allowing for players to respawn once their team completes an objective, instead of waiting for a long timer. Lofgren also criticized it for not being accommodating for newer players, stating "There is a learning playlist where new players can wet their feet, but the game graduates you out of this playlist quickly, and once it does you won’t be allowed to return."
