= Island Saver =

2020 video game

- Developer: Stormcloud Games
- Publisher: National Westminster Bank
- Producer: Frank Arnot
- Designers: Frank Arnot; Tom Goodchild; Andy West
- Programmer: Andy West
- Artist: Pat McGovern
- Composer: Euphonious
- Engine: Unity
- Platforms: Microsoft Windows; Nintendo Switch; PlayStation 4; Xbox One
- Release: 13 May 2020
- Genres: Action; Adventure; Educational
- Mode: Single-player

Island Saver is a free-to-play action-adventure game developed by Scottish studio Stormcloud Games and published by National Westminster Bank. It was released on Microsoft Windows, Nintendo Switch, PlayStation 4 and Xbox One on 13 May 2020.

== Gameplay ==
The game's objective is to traverse an island. New areas can be unlocked by spending in-game coins. These coins are obtained by cleaning up litter, cleaning up goop and in turn saving the bankimals—animals that can balloon up with coins like a piggy bank. As the game progresses, the player learns about the fundamentals of using a bank account, in addition to related topics such as the concept of paying taxes. Two downloadable expansions are available with the proceeds going towards the charities SpecialEffect and Young Money.

== Development ==
NatWest aimed to create an educational video game to teach children about managing money responsibly.

Our design vision for Island Saver was not only to create a fun, family friendly, full scale game but a game that also happened to be educational and have a positive environmental message. We wanted the game to reflect a real-world problem that young people would care about, so we covered the once tropical paradise of the Savvy Islands in gloop and plastic pollution and made it the player's job to transform the rundown islands back into a vibrant paradise.

— Frank Arnott, Stormcloud Games

== Reception ==
Gamepitt gave the game a 9/10 rating and was also positive with regards to the graphics and educational elements.

Other reviews were critical of the game; Evan Norris of VGChartz wrote "Island Saver is not a good game but, considering its raison d'être, it could be worse." He criticised the platforming and combat features of the game, describing the latter as a 'chore' and the controls as 'clumsy'. Jonjo Cosgrove also criticised the gameplay and called it 'tedious' and closed with the comment "[Island Saver is a] thoughtful game with little to no staying value beyond an initial play."

== Related media ==
Tie-in activity sheets were added to MoneySense section of NatWest's website.
