= IS Defense =

2016 video game

- Developer: Destructive Creations
- Publisher: Destructive Creations
- Engine: Unreal Engine 4
- Platform: Linux; Microsoft Windows
- Release: April 19, 2016
- Genre: Tower defense
- Mode: Single-player

IS Defense is a tower defense video game released on April 19, 2016, by Destructive Creations set in a politically fictional 2020 scenario where the Islamic State (IS) has expanded and is invading Europe. The player takes on the role of a NATO stationary machine-gun operator, deployed to defend the shores of Europe against the invaders. According to Destructive Creations, IS Defense was not made to spark controversy unlike its game Hatred which débuted a year prior, and instead is a political video game that represents feeling about the situation of the Middle Eastern conflict and the expansion of the Islamic State. It is also considered one of the first video games to feature combat against the Islamic State as a militant organization.

== History ==
IS Defense was announced in February 2016 by Destructive Creations where a trailer for the game was also released. The announcement was released via a (now deleted) Steam Community post on February 11, 2016, stating it was their "personal veto against what is happening in the Middle East nowadays.".

== Gameplay ==
You assume the role of a solitary NATO sentry, confined to a turret and assigned the mission of thwarting the invasion. Armed with a machine gun and a rocket launcher, you engage enemy of the Islamic State boats and other assailants. These weapons can be enhanced by accumulating skill points, and you can also gain additional assistance through killstreaks, which are subject to upgrades as well. The game features three distinct levels: Sicilian Shores, Spanish Harbor, and Croatian Mainland, each of which is deemed complete upon successfully eliminating a specified number of terrorists and destroying a sufficient quantity of their vehicles.

== Plot ==
In 2020, the situation regarding the expansion of the Islamic State escalated dramatically. The group seized control of all of Northern Africa, propagating their genocidal interpretation of global order. Heavily armed, numerous, and ready for any confrontation, the Islamic State initiated an invasion of Europe, crossing the Mediterranean Sea. The player assumes the role of a stationary machine-gun operator for NATO, assigned to protect the European coastline. His objective is to eliminate as many invaders as possible until he meets his demise. He has at his disposal NATO support forces, as well as a machine gun and rocket launcher. Throughout the course of this valiant defense, he is presented with opportunities to enhance his equipment, improve his physical capabilities, and advance his military rank, all of which influence the effectiveness of the support he can summon.

== Reception ==
The game IS Defense received a metascore of 50 by Metacritic of both mixed and average reviews. Gry-Online gave the video game a 55 stating it's repetitive and lacks content besides the shooting of Islamic State militants, but overall is good and has good mechanics. CD-Action gave the video game a score of 35, saying that there's no point in playing the game. VICE News claimed the video game was Islamophobic and perpetuated xenophobic sentiments against Muslims.
