= New World Interactive =

American video game developer

New World Interactive LLC
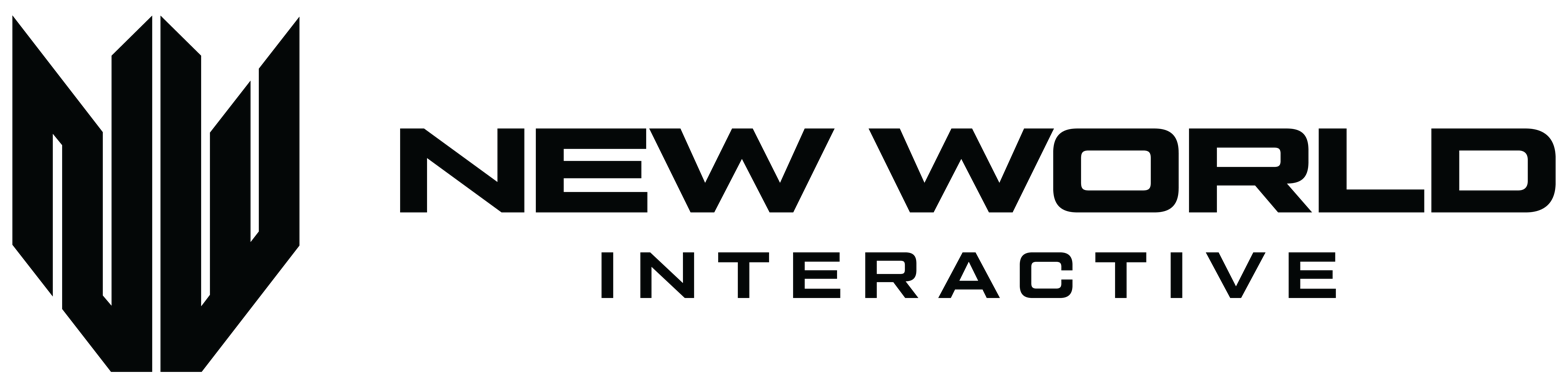
- Type: Subsidiary
- Industry: Video games
- Founded: 2010; 16 years ago
- Founder: Andrew Spearin; Jeremy Blum
- Headquarters: Denver, Colorado, U.S.
- Key people: Jeremy Blum (advisor)
- Products: Insurgency; Day of Infamy; Insurgency: Sandstorm
- Number of employees: 58 (2021)
- Parent: Saber Interactive (2020–present)
- Website: newworldinteractive.com

New World Interactive LLC (NWI) is an American video game developer founded by Andrew Spearin and Jeremy Blum in 2010. The company developed the multiplayer tactical shooter games Insurgency (2014), Day of Infamy (2017), and Insurgency: Sandstorm (2018). In 2020, New World Interactive was acquired by Saber Interactive.

== History ==
In 2002, Andrew Spearin, a Canadian Army veteran, began development of a total conversion mod for Valve's Source Engine that depicted a conflict between the United States Marine Corps and rebel insurgents, with a focus on realism and authenticity based on Spearin's military experiences. Three years later, in 2005, Jeremy Blum and other Red Orchestra developers joined Andrew Spearin to work on the mod. The mod, titled Insurgency: Modern Infantry Combat, was released in 2007.

In 2010, Spearin and Blum co-founded New World Interactive. Four years later, Insurgency, the standalone sequel to Modern Infantry Combat, was released by NWI. The game was very well-received.

After the major success of Insurgency, NWI started development on Day of Infamy, another tactical shooter similar to Insurgency, but set in World War II and featuring new gameplay mechanics absent from Insurgency. Development on Day of Infamy began in 2016 as a mod for Insurgency, and was further developed as a standalone game.

In 2018, NWI released Insurgency: Sandstorm, a direct sequel to the original Insurgency. Sandstorm was the first NWI-developed game to not be developed in Source (instead using Unreal Engine 4), and featured both improvements over Insurgency and returning game mechanics from Day of Infamy. The game was announced to be released for Xbox and PlayStation systems, but they were significantly delayed over several years, eventually releasing in 2021. Sandstorm was positively received on release.

In February 2019, New World Interactive announced it would be expanding with a new development studio known as New World North in Calgary, Alberta. In July 2019, NWI Calgary announced their hiring of Michael Grills (formerly of BioWare; hired into the newly formed position of Art Director) and Derek Czerkaski (hired as the also newly formed position of Head of Production).

In March 2020, it was announced that former company President Keith Warner would take over as CEO, with Founder Jeremy Blum acting as strategic and creative advisor.

In August 2020, New World Interactive was acquired by Saber Interactive as part of Embracer Group. In December 2023, during larger restructurings at Embracer Group, Saber Interactive instituted several layoffs at New World Interactive and shifted others to fill open positions at Saber Interactive, while work on Insurgency: Sandstorm and an unannounced project would continue.

In March 2024, Saber was sold to Beacon Interactive, a new company from Saber co-founder Matthew Karch. Many of Saber's studios, including New World Interactive, were included in the sale.

== Games ==
=== Insurgency ===
Insurgency is a 2014 tactical shooter video game, following a fictional conflict between the "Security" and "Insurgents" faction in a fictional Middle Eastern region. As a tactical shooter, Insurgency features a limited HUD, lethal weaponry, and a lack of regular respawning. The player's inventory is determined by their character class and supply points (SP), which limit the weapons and equipment the player can bring with them.

Production began in September 2011, and the game was released in early access in 2013. The game was fully released on Steam on January 22, 2014. The game was a success, selling 400,000 copies in the first 8 months and ending up with approximately 3.76 million copies sold up to July 2017. Insurgency was awarded Indie DB's Indie of the Year 2014 Editor's Choice and Indie of the Year 2014 Player's Choice.

=== Day of Infamy ===
Day of Infamy is a 2017 tactical shooter video game, following battles between the Allies and Axis on the Western Front of World War II. Though sharing basic gameplay elements with Insurgency, Day of Infamy features significant gameplay changes including a lack of low-powered optical sights, the addition of purchasable cosmetic items, and a new fire support and command system.

Initially developed as a Steam Workshop mod for Insurgency in 2016, development shifted to the creation of an independent game, with the now-standalone Day of Infamy being released in early access in July 2016 and seeing a full release on Steam on March 23, 2017. The game was generally well-received.

=== Insurgency: Sandstorm ===
Insurgency: Sandstorm is a 2018 tactical shooter video game, following the same setting as the original Insurgency. Sandstorm refines gameplay mechanics from both Insurgency and Day of Infamy, including a retouched fire support system, and introduces a detailed cosmetics system, purchasable outfits, weapon skins, and drivable vehicles, among other gameplay mechanics.

Development began in 2016, and was the first NWI-developed game to not use Source (instead using Unreal Engine 4), as well as the first to be released for consoles. A campaign, following characters as they survive the 2003 invasion of Iraq and the lasting Iraqi insurgency, was planned and highlighted in prerelease marketing, but was ultimately canceled during development. The Windows version was released on Steam on December 12, 2018; however, the planned MacOS and Linux versions were canceled in 2019, while the Xbox One and PlayStation 4 versions saw repeated delays until they were released on September 29, 2021, including versions for the Xbox Series X and Series S and PlayStation 5. The game was released to critical acclaim and continues to maintain live service content updates as of 2026.
