= Insurgency: Sandstorm =

2018 tactical shooter video game

- Developer: New World Interactive
- Publisher: Focus Home Interactive
- Engine: Unreal Engine 4
- Platforms: Microsoft Windows; PlayStation 4; Xbox One; PlayStation 5; Xbox Series X/S
- Release: Microsoft Windows; December 12, 2018; PlayStation 4, Xbox One; September 29, 2021; PlayStation 5, Xbox Series X/S; January 30, 2024
- Genre: Tactical shooter
- Mode: Multiplayer

Insurgency: Sandstorm is a multiplayer tactical first-person shooter video game developed by New World Interactive and published by Focus Home Interactive. The game is a sequel to the 2014 video game Insurgency. Set in an unnamed fictional Middle Eastern region, the game depicts a conflict between two factions: Security and Insurgents.

Insurgency: Sandstorm was officially announced in February 2016 for Microsoft Windows. It was released on December 12, 2018, for Windows; the previously announced Linux and macOS versions of the game were cancelled. The PlayStation 4 and Xbox One versions went through numerous delays and were released on September 29, 2021, followed by PlayStation 5 and Xbox Series X/S versions on January 30, 2024.

Insurgency: Sandstorm received generally favorable reviews from critics, who praised its realistic gameplay, level design, sound design, atmosphere, graphics, and fluid animations, but criticized its technical issues and optimization, with some lamenting the cancellation of the planned story campaign.

== Gameplay ==
A screenshot of the in-game firing range, set in part of the map "Farmhouse". The player is holding an "Alpha AK", based on the custom Kalashnikov rifles used by the Russian FSB's Alpha Group.

Similar to Insurgency and Day of Infamy, Insurgency: Sandstorm features a minimal HUD, lacking a health bar, ammunition count, or minimap. The Insurgency series has tactical, realistic gameplay, with moments of intensity. Weapons are accurate and can kill in very few shots, placing emphasis on using teamwork and cooperation to survive. Like its predecessors, most game modes in Sandstorm do not feature instant respawns; instead, dead players must spectate and wait for their team to complete an objective in order to respawn. Improvements from Insurgency include updated visuals, character customization, cosmetics, weapon skins, a player progression system, larger maps, and drivable technicals.

Players are divided into two opposing teams: Security and Insurgents. Security primarily uses newer weaponry predominantly originating from NATO and Western countries (e.g. M4A1, L85A2, MP7, M110 SASS, M45A1), while Insurgents use a diverse mixture of weaponry ranging from Russian and Chinese weapons (e.g. AK-74, QBZ-03, TOZ-194, PKM, Makarov) to outdated and unique Western weapons (e.g. M16A2, P90, M1 Garand, Welrod). Each faction is designed to be asymmetric, and while most weapons have a loose "equivalent", they typically do not perform similarly; for example, though Security's MR 73 is intended to be their "high-powered sidearm" equivalent to the Insurgents' Desert Eagle, both weapons are different types of handguns (a double-action/single-action revolver and a semi-automatic pistol, respectively) and are notably different in gameplay style, situational effectiveness, and attachments.

Players can choose from eight classes with varying armaments: Rifleman, Breacher, Advisor, Demolitions, Marksman, Gunner, Observer, and Commander. Players have limited "supply points" (SP) to spend on weapons, attachments, and equipment, but must also manage their weight, which increases with the amount or type of weapons and equipment currently equipped; higher weight reduces the player's stamina and movement speed. Players can use SP to modify their weapons with a variety of attachments, such as weapon sights, laser sights, foregrips, bipods, muzzle attachments, and suppressors, with additional attachments available for specific weapons and classes, such as underbarrel explosive grenade launchers for Demolitions. Gas masks, night-vision goggles, plastic explosives, rocket launchers, and various types of grenades are available as equipment. Players may also change their body armor and carrier ("light", "heavy", or none), which affect their survivability and carried munitions respectively.

Returning from Day of Infamy is the fire support system, using which fire support may be requested by a Commander if a friendly Observer is within 10 meters of them. Security can call for close air support, such as an A-10 strafe, or for an AH-64 Apache or UH-60 Black Hawk to loiter and attack visible enemies, though these helicopters can be shot down by enemy rocket launchers or anti-materiel rifles. Insurgents can call for an improvised drone strike, rocket artillery, an IED suicide drone, or a chemical gas strike that kills anyone in its radius without a gas mask on. Both teams have access to explosive and smoke artillery (mortars for Insurgents); Security fires few rounds with greater precision, while Insurgents fire more rounds with less precision.

=== Game modes ===
==== Versus ====
- Push Security/Insurgents: The named team will assume the role of attackers and must capture three or four objectives in sequential order. For every objective captured, more reinforcements are made available and more time is given to capture the next objective. The defenders must protect the objectives from the attackers. If the attackers are able to capture all objectives, they must find and destroy the defenders' cache; at this point, the defenders only have one life to fend off the attackers. The match ends if either team runs out of reinforcements, players. Defenders win if the time is up and the attackers win if they destroy the cache.
- Firefight: Both teams must sequentially capture all three objectives. Dead players only respawn when their team captures an objective. The match ends if the enemy team is eliminated or a team captures all three objectives.
- Frontline: Both teams must capture objectives one by one and then destroy the enemy cache, similar to Push. Players must capture enemy objectives while also defending their own. Dead players only respawn when their team captures an objective. The match ends if the enemy team is eliminated or the enemy cache is destroyed.
- Domination: Similar to Firefight, there are three objectives which must be captured; however, they may be captured in any order at any time. Upon death, players immediately respawn in a random location on the map. Teams earn points for each objective held, and the team that reaches the point threshold wins.
- Ambush: Security team must protect a randomly designated VIP player and escort them to one of the two extraction points, while the Insurgents must kill the VIP. The VIP is only armed with a suppressed Tariq and heavy armor. Insurgent win if the VIP is killed or the time is up, while Security win if the VIP reaches an extraction point or all Insurgents die.
- Defusal: Security team must protect two groups of barrels with chemicals from the Insurgents, who must destroy the groups. If one cache is destroyed, the defenders must protect the remaining objective. Defuse is played over two rounds; Security earn points for each objective that survives by the end of the round, while Insurgents earn points for each objective destroyed. The team that has the most points by the end of the match wins.

==== Co-op ====
- Checkpoint Security/Insurgents: Players will control characters of the mentioned team and must sequentially capture objectives or destroy caches while fighting computer-controlled enemies as they advance across the map, similar to Push. After capturing some enemy objectives, the enemy may initiate a 90 seconds counterattack, during which surviving players must defend the point against a wave of enemies; a longer counterattack of 180 seconds will always occur on the final objective. All dead players respawn when an objective is secured. Players win if all objectives are captured and destroyed and the final counterattack is repelled.
- Hardcore Checkpoint: Checkpoint with slower movement, and no friendly player HUD icons. Upon death, players respawn with a limited loadout consisting of their team's bolt-action rifle and their chosen sidearm, and they can only reequip their selected loadout through a supply box placed on a random objective and in the last objective.
- Outpost: Players must defend an objective from seven waves of enemies, similar to the counterattacks from Checkpoint. Every two waves is a special enemy wave, consisting of special enemies such as suicide bombers and armored enemies with machine guns. Players only have two SP at the beginning of each match, with two more earned with each wave completed. If an objective is lost, players are pushed back to a different objective; if all objectives are lost, the match is lost. Players win if all seven waves are repelled. All players are placed on Security in this mode.
- Survival: Players must capture a series of random objectives across a map while fighting enemies. Players are given limited SP and can only equip sidearms in the loadout menu; other weapons must be acquired from fallen enemies or from weapon cases at each captured objective that generate a random primary weapon when opened. The final objective always has a long enemy counterattack that must be repelled to allow a helicopter to extract the players. Players win if all objectives are captured and the final counterattack is repelled. All players are placed on Security in this mode.

==== Removed game modes ====
- Skirmish: Like Firefight, there are three objectives that both teams must capture. Each team also has a cache to protect. If the caches of both teams are destroyed, the game will be played like Firefight. To win, the enemy cache must be destroyed and all three objectives must be captured. Removed in update 1.4.1 due to low popularity, to decrease queue times, and to allow the developers to maintain other game modes.
- Frenzy: Checkpoint with almost all enemies using knives instead of firearms. Special enemies include armored enemies that take several shots to kill, teleporting enemies that dodge attacks, and burning enemies that drop a lit Molotov cocktail on death. All players are placed on Security in this mode. Replaced by Outpost in update 1.8 due to low popularity and converted into a Limited Time Playlist.
- Arcade: Casual modes that were rotated out with updates, such as Team Deathmatch. Replaced by Limited Time Playlists in update 1.4.
- Competitive: Firefight in a five-versus-five ranked queue, with higher equipment costs and a different class structure. Removed in update 1.9.1 due to low popularity.

==== Limited Time Playlists ====
Sandstorm features "Limited Time Playlists", temporary casual modes that are generally existing modes with gameplay-changing modifications. These may be significant changes, such as "Team Deathmatch" (both teams fight to gain a certain amount of kills with wider loadouts and instant respawns), "Hot Potato" (live fragmentation grenades are dropped upon death), "Task Force 666" (Frenzy on night maps only; players heal by killing enemies), and "Running in the 90s" (Checkpoint with sights disabled and weapons always pointing forward, plus additional changes such as increased health and walkspeed, mimicking classic shooters such as Counter-Strike and Unreal Tournament). However, the most common are weapon-limiting modes such as "Gang War" (Push with handguns only) and "Budget Antiquing" (Checkpoint with weapons limited to a selection of older firearms). These modes are also available for custom servers.

== Development ==
Development of a sequel to Insurgency began with Insurgency: Exiles, an open world tactical shooter set on Ometepe during the Nicaraguan Revolution. However, development was canceled due to the game becoming increasingly similar in scope to Grand Theft Auto or Far Cry, which proved to be unfeasible for the development team.

Insurgency: Sandstorm was first announced on February 23, 2016, on New World Interactive's website. The game was confirmed to be on Unreal Engine 4, instead of Source like Insurgency and Day of Infamy. The fire support system from Day of Infamy was confirmed to return. Drivable vehicles were also confirmed, a first for the series. Lead designer Michael Tsarouhas aimed to "find a balance" between military simulator games such as Arma and Squad, and action games such as Call of Duty, to provide both action and realism in gameplay.

Early in development, Sandstorm had a planned singleplayer and cooperative story campaign, described as focusing on "a squad of characters as they face increasingly challenging chapters, from the invasion of Iraq in 2003 through the insurrection period and leading to the present day." A trailer for the campaign was shown at E3 2017. However, the campaign was later canceled in January 2018. Tsarouhas explained in an announcement that it was canceled due to "high production requirements and our commitment to deliver to our fans in 2018". He added that the initial plan to set the game in an actual conflict was restricting and "admittedly, sensitive", and clarified that the conflict presently depicted in Sandstorm was fictional but drew inspiration from real conflicts. The announcement claimed the campaign would be "considered again at a later date"; however, no news related to the campaign has been released since.

== Release ==
Insurgency: Sandstorm was released for Windows on December 12, 2018, through Steam. Linux and macOS releases were planned, but they were both cancelled in December 2019. Though PlayStation 4 and Xbox One releases of Sandstorm were announced and intended to be released with the Windows version, their release was repeatedly delayed due to development issues, first to 2019, then early 2020, then August 2020. Ports for PlayStation 4 and Xbox One were eventually released on September 29, 2021, with versions for PlayStation 5 and Xbox Series X/S following on January 30, 2024.

Since its release, the game has had several updates adding new maps, game modes, cosmetic items, weapons, and equipment, including returning content from Insurgency and Day of Infamy. Since the release of update 1.7, "Operation: Nightfall", in June 2020, major content updates have been called "operations", similar to other tactical shooters such as Tom Clancy's Rainbow Six Siege. "Operation: Nightfall" included paid cosmetic items and weapon skins as optional downloadable content, a first for the Insurgency series. The game is currently on update 1.22, "Operation: Echoes", released on October 14, 2026.

== Reception ==
Reception

Aggregate score
| Aggregator | Score |
|---|---|
| Metacritic | (PC) 78/100 |

Review scores
| Publication | Score |
|---|---|
| Game Informer | 7.75/10 |
| IGN | 8.8/10 |
| Jeuxvideo.com | 16/20 |
| PC Gamer (US) | 85/100 |

Insurgency: Sandstorm received acclaim from critics for its realistic gameplay and atmospheric sound design. VG247 rated Sandstorm as "one of the best multiplayer games of the year". Sandstorm received an 88/100 from IGN, writing "[it] nails the balance between realism and fun", though it criticized unclear map boundaries. PCGamer rated the game 85/100, calling it "terrifying", and further expressing "I'll never forget the screaming". It received "generally favorable" reviews according to review aggregator Metacritic.

Sandstorm's optimization received some criticism, with Worth Playing writing "In the heat of an intense battle, your processor will also put out some heat." A more critical review came from PCGamesN, who felt the game was "behind the times in both theme and looks" with "nameless locations with nameless conflicts", lamenting the removal of the planned story campaign, which would have featured "two Iraqi women crossing a war-torn land"—"It's a shame to miss out on a potentially refreshing perspective."

=== Controversies ===
Update 1.9, "Operation: Cold Blood", included a major overhaul of the co-op mode weapon availability which, prior to the change, allowed each faction to use the opposing faction's weapons; update 1.9 removed this, standardizing the weapon loadouts with the Versus modes. The community response to this change was very negative, leading New World Interactive to undo the change and release an apology on Steam.

Update 1.9.1, "Lunar New Year Update", included two Chinese rifles (QBZ-97 and QTS-11) and Chinese-themed DLC cosmetic sets for Security and Insurgents, the latter being a bright red changshan. The planned cosmetics were harshly criticized by the community for clashing with the game's established aesthetic. Following the backlash, New World Interactive apologized and announced they would not release the cosmetics; update 1.9.1 released on February 2, 2021, without them.

Update 1.17 "Operation: Resurgence" introduced cross play between last generation (PlayStation 4, Xbox One) and current generation (PC, PlayStation 5, Xbox Series X/S) systems. Due to hardware limitations on last gen consoles, server player limits were reduced from 14v14 to 10v10 across game modes. There has been no response from the development team regarding the downgrade despite fans pleading on the Insurgency subreddit and various game forums.
