= Insurgency (video game) =

2014 tactical shooter video game

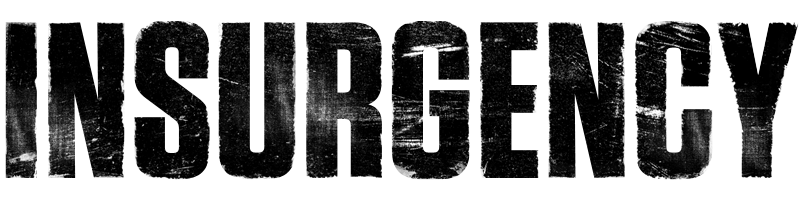
- Developer: New World Interactive
- Publisher: New World Interactive
- Composer: Rich Douglas
- Engine: Source
- Platforms: Microsoft Windows; OS X Linux
- Release: January 22, 2014
- Genres: First-person shooter, action, strategy
- Mode: Multiplayer

Insurgency is a multiplayer tactical first-person shooter video game developed and published by New World Interactive. It is a standalone sequel to Insurgency: Modern Infantry Combat, a community-made mod for Valve's Source engine. The game was released for Microsoft Windows, OS X, and Linux on January 22, 2014.

The game received mixed to positive reviews from game critics, who compared it to Counter-Strike: Global Offensive, but was acclaimed by players for its realism, harsh difficulty, mod support, sound design, animations, levels and gameplay. The game's success spawned a spinoff, Day of Infamy, and a sequel, Insurgency: Sandstorm.

== Gameplay ==
One of Insurgency's defining characteristics is its hardcore gameplay. Unlike other first-person shooters, Insurgency has a very simple HUD, and lacks virtual crosshairs, ammunition and player health counters and minimaps. Guns are accurate and extremely deadly. Most game modes do not feature instant respawns. Instead, on death, players must spectate and wait for their team to complete an objective in order to respawn.

At the beginning of each game, players are able to choose a class and select a variety of weapons. Players have a certain number of supply points to spend on purchasing weapons and modifications.

=== Game modes ===
==== Versus ====
- Push: The attacking team must capture three territorial objectives in sequential order. For every objective captured, more reinforcements are made available and more time is given to capture the next objective. The defenders must protect the objectives from the attackers. If the attackers are able to capture all three objectives, they must find and destroy the cache. At this point, the defenders only have one life to fend off the attackers. The game ends when either team runs out of reinforcements and players or time.
- Firefight: Both teams must battle each other to capture all three territorial objectives. Each player only has one life and can only respawn after their team has captured an objective. A team wins when either the entire other team is eliminated, or all three objectives are captured.
- Skirmish: Like Firefight, there are three territorial objectives that both teams have to capture. Each team also as a cache to protect. If the caches of both teams are destroyed, the game will be played like Firefight. To win, the cache must be destroyed and all three objectives captured.
- Occupy: Each team has a certain number of reinforcement waves. There is one central territorial objective that the teams have to the capture. The team that is in possession of the objective will be given infinite reinforcement waves. The game is won when the other team has run out of reinforcement waves, and do not have any players remaining.
- Ambush: One team has a VIP that they must escort to an end location, whilst the other team must stop the convoy from reaching their end destination. The game ends when the VIP reaches his or her destination, when the VIP is killed, or when the members of the ambushing team are all dead.
- Strike: The attacking team must destroy the three caches of the defending team. For every cache the attacking team destroys, time and additional reinforcements are rewarded. The game ends when the attacking team runs out of reinforcements and players, or when all three caches are destroyed.
- Elimination: The attacking team must destroy one of two caches belonging to the defending team. Each player only has one life. The game ends when one of the caches is destroyed, or when the entire attacking team is eliminated.
- Infiltrate: Each team must capture and return the enemy's intel back to their base. Reinforcements are only rewarded when the enemy intel is captured, or when the enemy with the intel belonging to the player's team is eliminated. (This game mode has since been discontinued)
- Flashpoint: Each team receives two caches with one neutral territorial objective. The game ends when the opposing team's caches are destroyed, and the entire territory is captured. (This game mode has since been discontinued)

==== Co-op ====
- Checkpoint: Players are grouped into one team and must complete mission-based objectives against AI. Every completed objective will grant fallen players another life.
- Hunt: Players are grouped into one team and must eliminate the entire group of AI insurgents. Each player only has one life. The game ends when all insurgents are killed and the weapons cache is destroyed.
- Survival: Players play as insurgents who must take on increasingly difficult waves of security forces. Each successful wave grants players extra supply points to purchase stronger weapons and modifications. Any dead players will also be revived at the end of each wave.
- Outpost: Players are grouped into one team and must protect their weapons cache from opposing forces. Every wave that is successfully defended will grant the players reinforcements.
- Conquer: Players must capture objectives and defend them from opposing forces. Destroying opposing caches will reduce the amount of opposing forces.

== Development ==
Insurgency began development in September 2011 following the positive reception to the Insurgency: Modern Infantry Combat mod for Half-Life 2. Production on the game began in September 2011 using the Source engine. In 2012, a demo of Insurgency was displayed at PAX Prime.

In July 2012, a kickstarter was launched for Insurgency, with a goal of $180,000. The kickstarter later failed with only 37% of the monetary goal raised. After multiple obstacles to work through, such as constantly running out of funds, the game was finally launched on Steam Early Access in March 2013. During the ten months in early access, the developers of Insurgency were able to get feedback from the community, and thoroughly updated the game. The game was officially released on January 22, 2014.

== Reception ==
Insurgency was met with overall good reviews. Metacritic, which grades on a 100-point scale, gave Insurgency a 74. IGN rated it a 7.5 out of 10, Hooked Gamers rated it a 9 out of 10, and PC Gamer rated it a 77.

=== Sales ===
As of July 2017, there are approximately 3.76 million owners of Insurgency on Steam. According to Andrew Spearin, the creative director of New World Interactive, about 400,000 copies were sold in the first eight months on Steam.

== Sequel ==
In February 2016, New World Interactive announced a sequel, Insurgency: Sandstorm. The game is available for Microsoft Windows, and for the PlayStation 4, Xbox One, PlayStation 5, and Xbox Series X/S. Insurgency: Sandstorm is published by Focus Home Interactive and uses Unreal Engine 4. Originally planned to be released in 2017, the Microsoft Windows version of the game was released on December 12, 2018, on Steam to critical acclaim from game critics and players alike. The console versions were released on September 29, 2021 for said consoles.
