= SA80 =

Family of British bullpup assault rifles

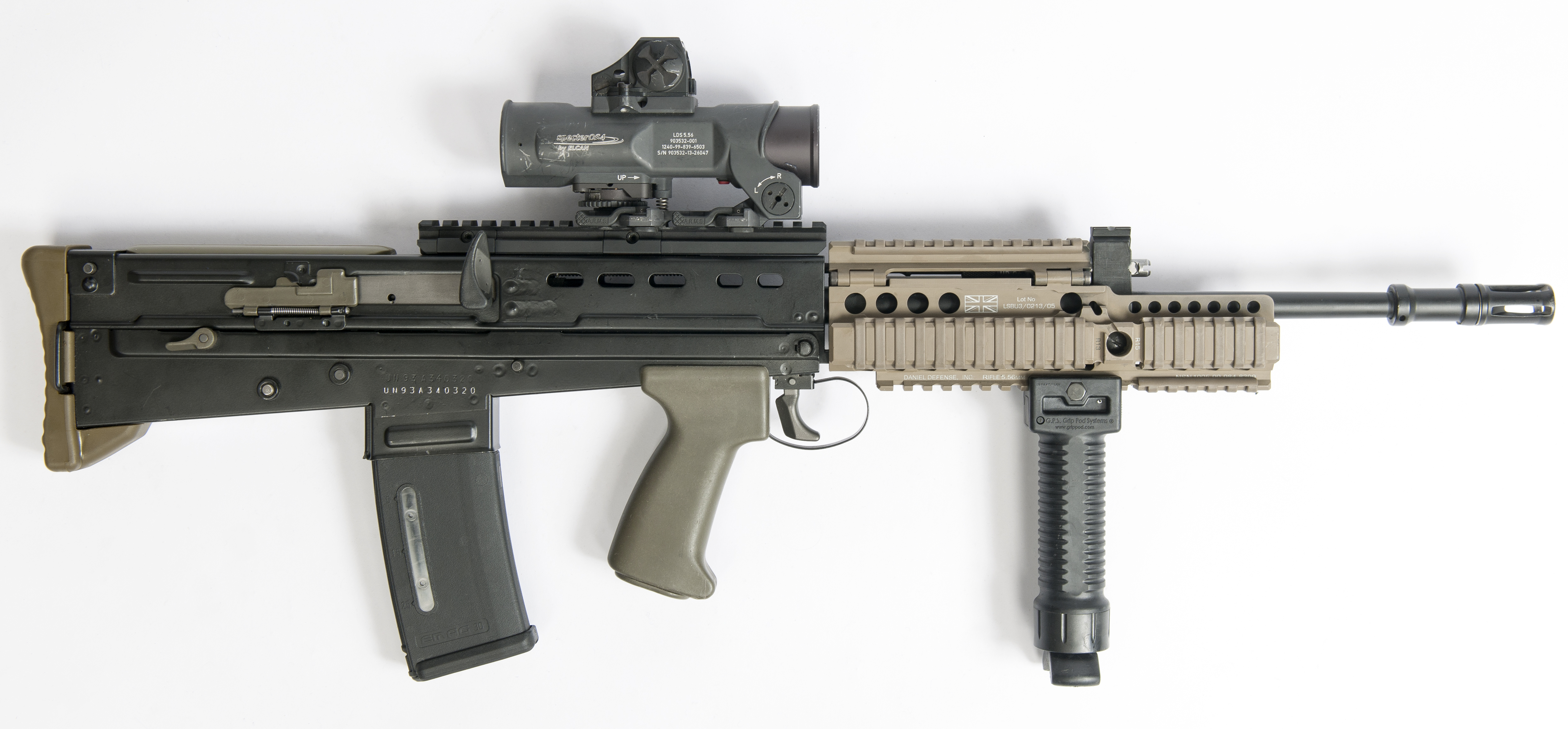
- L85A2 with ELCAN LDS and 2009 upgrade suite
- Type: Bullpup assault rifle (L85); Light support weapon (L86 LSW); Carbine (L22)
- Place of origin: United Kingdom

Service history
- In service: 1985–present
- Used by: See Users
- Wars: See Conflicts

Production history
- Designed: 1970s–1980s
- Manufacturer: Royal Small Arms Factory; Royal Ordnance
- Unit cost: £1,300 (2015)
- Produced: 1985–1994
- No. built: Approx. 350,000 (L85, L86); Approx. 21,700 (L98)
- Variants: See Variants

Specifications (L85A2)
- Mass: 4.98 kilograms (11.0 lb) (L85A2 with SUSAT sight and loaded 30-round magazine)
- Length: 785 millimetres (30.9 in) (L85A2)
- Barrel length: 518 millimetres (20.4 in) (L85A2)
- Cartridge: 5.56×45mm NATO
- Action: Gas-operated, rotating bolt
- Rate of fire: 610–775 rpm
- Muzzle velocity: 930–940 m/s (3,100–3,100 ft/s)
- Effective firing range: 400 metres (1,300 ft)
- Feed system: 30-round detachable STANAG magazine, 30-round detachable polymer Magpul EMAG, 60-round casket magazine 20-round detachable magazine (carbine)
- Sights: Telescopic SUSAT, ACOG and ELCAN LDS scopes, aperture iron sights

The SA80 (Small Arms for the 1980s) is a British family of 5.56×45mm NATO service weapons used by the British Army. The L85 Rifle variant has been the standard issue service rifle of the British Armed Forces since 1987, replacing the L1A1 Self-Loading Rifle. The prototypes were created in 1976, with production of the A1 variant starting in 1985 and ending in 1994. The A2 variant came to be as the result of a significant upgrade in the early 2000s by Heckler & Koch and remains in service as of 2025. The A3 variant was first issued in 2018 with several new improvements.

The remainder of the SA80 family consists of the L86 Light Support Weapon, the short-barrelled L22 Carbine and the L98 Cadet rifle.

The SA80 was the last in a long line of British weapons (including the Lee–Enfield family) to come from the Royal Small Arms Factory, the national arms development and production facility at Enfield Lock, before its weapons factory was closed down in 1988.

== Development ==
=== Post-war intermediate weapon development ===
The idea dates back to the late 1940s, when an ambitious programme to develop a new cartridge and new class of rifle was launched in the United Kingdom based on combat experience drawn from World War II. Two 7mm (.280 in) prototypes were built in a bullpup configuration, designated the EM-1 and EM-2. The latter was brought into service briefly as "Rifle, Automatic, Calibre .280, Number 9". When NATO standardised on the 7.62mm rifle cartridge as the standard calibre for its service rifles, further development of these rifles was discontinued and the British Army adopted the 7.62 mm L1A1 Self-Loading Rifle semi-automatic rifle, a licence-built version of the Belgian FN FAL.

=== 1960s – 1970s: 4.85×49mm, XL64, XL65, XL68 ===
In 1969, the Enfield factory began work on a brand new family of weapons, chambered in a newly designed British 4.85×49mm intermediate cartridge. While the experimental weapon family was very different from the EM-2 in internal design and construction methods, its bullpup configuration with an optical sight was a clear influence on the design of what was to become the SA80. The system was to be composed of two weapons: the XL64E5 rifle (also called the "Enfield Individual Weapon") and a light support weapon known as the XL65E4 light machine gun.

The sheet metal construction and the design of the bolt, bolt carrier, guide rods and the weapon's disassembly showed strong similarities to the Armalite AR-18 which was manufactured under licence from 1975 to 1983 by the Sterling Armaments Company of Dagenham, Essex, and which had been tested by the British Ministry of Defence in 1966 and 1969.

During the development of the SA80, a bullpup conversion was made of an AR-18 and a Stoner 63 at Enfield due to the fact they could be used with stocks folded/without stocks which allowed the bullpup conversion and were later chambered in the experimental 4.85x49mm round. A bullpup conversion of the AR-15 was previously considered but the buffer tube in stock prevented the idea from reaching fruition.

Technically, in the mid-1970s, the 4.85×49mm round was seen as superior to the then existing version of 5.56mm M193 round in use by the US (for the M16/M16A1) and by other forces. This was the expressed view of trials team members whilst demonstrating the XL64E5 prototype at the British Army School of Infantry at Warminster. Development of small-arms munitions have a long and continuous life and it was estimated by the trials specialists from Enfield that this weapon would ultimately be superior in the 4.85mm configuration. For the 4.85mm round, both propellant and projectile were at the beginning of their respective development curves. Weight for weight, more rounds of ammunition could be carried by an individual soldier – a considerable advantage on the battlefield.

It was regarded as probable at the time that the argument for the 5.56mm standard within NATO had more to do with the economics involved. Over the lifetime of a small-arms weapon type, far more money is spent on the munitions than the weapons themselves. If the 5.56mm supporters had lost the argument in favour of a British 4.85mm round, the economic impact would have been very large, and political pressure undoubtedly played a part in the final decision. In 1976, the prototypes were ready to undergo trials.

=== 1970s – 1980s: 5.56×45mm, XL70, XL73, XL78 ===
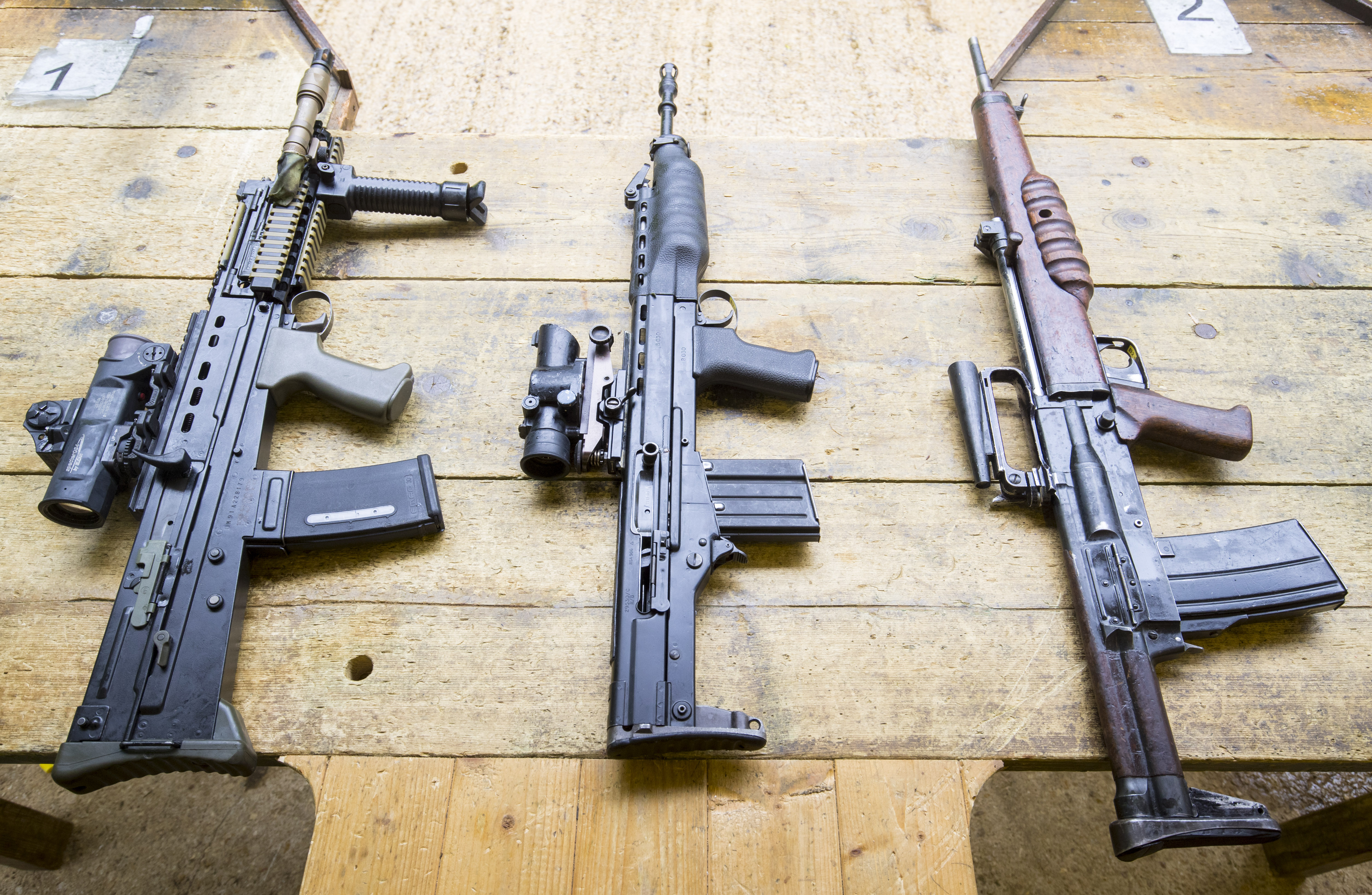
Pictured left to right are the L85A2, XL 60 and EM-2

After NATO's decision to standardise ammunition among its members, Enfield engineers re-chambered the rifles to the American 5.56×45mm NATO M193 cartridge. The newly redesigned 5.56mm version of the XL64E5 became known as the XL70E3. The left-handed XL68 was also re-chambered in 5.56×45mm as the XL78. The 5.56mm light support weapon variant, the XL73E3, developed from the XL65E4, was noted for the full-length receiver extension with the bipod under the muzzle now indicative of the type.

=== 1980s, 5.56×45mm, XL85, XL86 ===
Further development out of the initial so-called "Phase A" pre-production series led to the XL85 and XL86. While the XL85E1 and XL86E1 were ultimately adopted as the L85 and L86 respectively, a number of additional test models were produced. The XL85E2 and XL86E2 were designed to an alternate build standard with 12 components different from E1 variants, including parts of the gas system, bolt, and magazine catch. Three series of variants were created for "Environmental User Trials". XL85E3 and XL86E3 variants were developed with 24 modified parts, most notably a plastic safety plunger. The E4's had 21 modified parts, no modification to the pistol grip, and an aluminium safety plunger, unlike the E3 variants. Lastly, the E5 variants had 9 modified parts in addition to those from the E3/E4 variants.

SA80 development was complicated from the start. One complication was at least three project staffing changes at the Royal Small Arms Factory, which resulted in repetitive testing. One problem with the design of the gun itself was that the cases would be ejected at constantly varying angles as it heated up and the rate of fire changed, resulting in a large ejection port. The conversion from 4.85mm to 5.56mm also caused a complication, as the rate of fire dropped but the pressure and time curve of the rounds were different. The 4.85mm round was based on the 5.56mm case in anticipation of the need to convert calibres. The barrel was changed easily, but the gas ports were much larger. Pressure problems had less of an effect on the LSW due to its longer barrel.

== Production ==
=== Accepted into service: 5.56×45mm, L85A1, L86A1, L98A1 ===
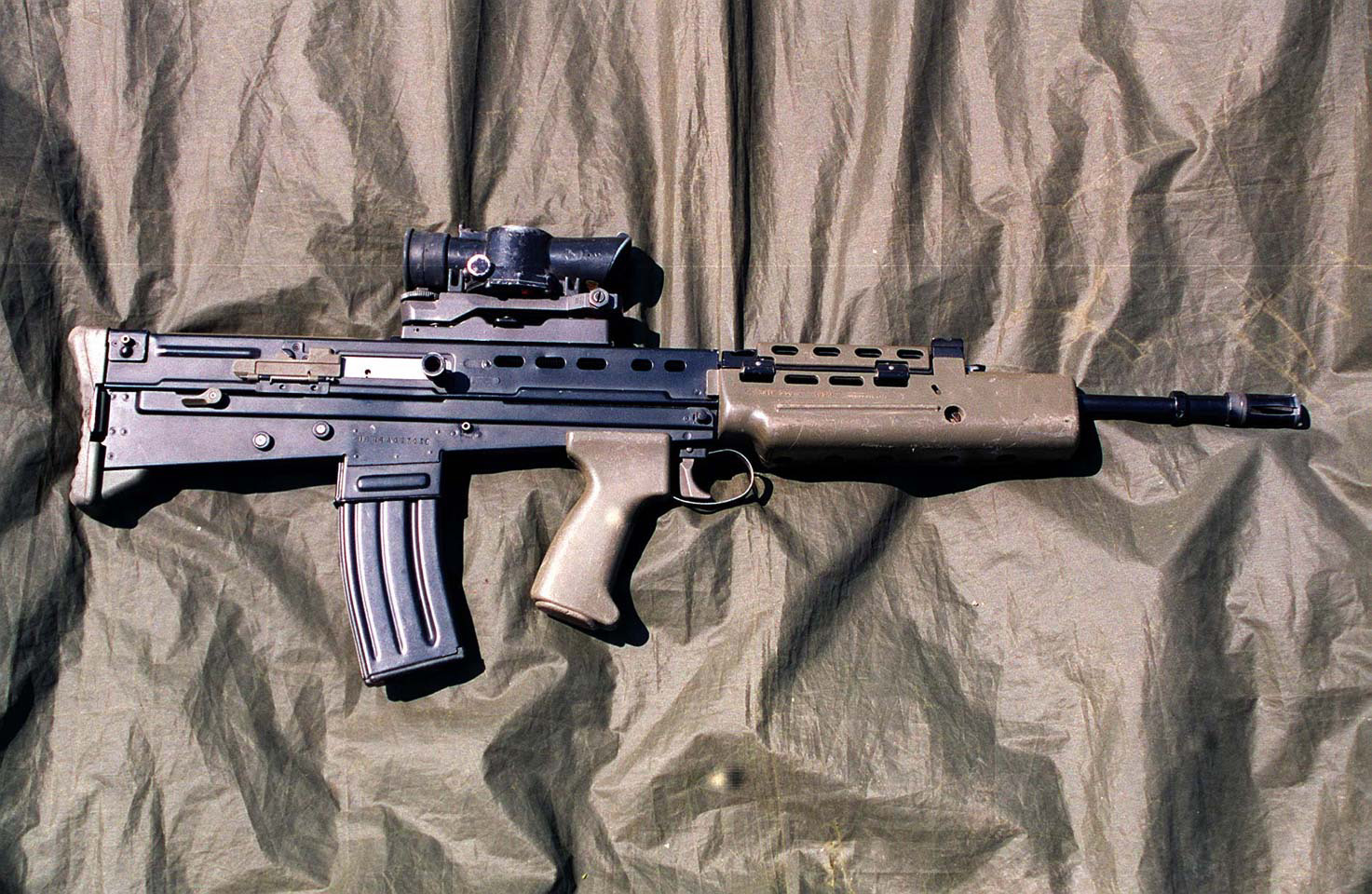
L85A1 with SUSAT

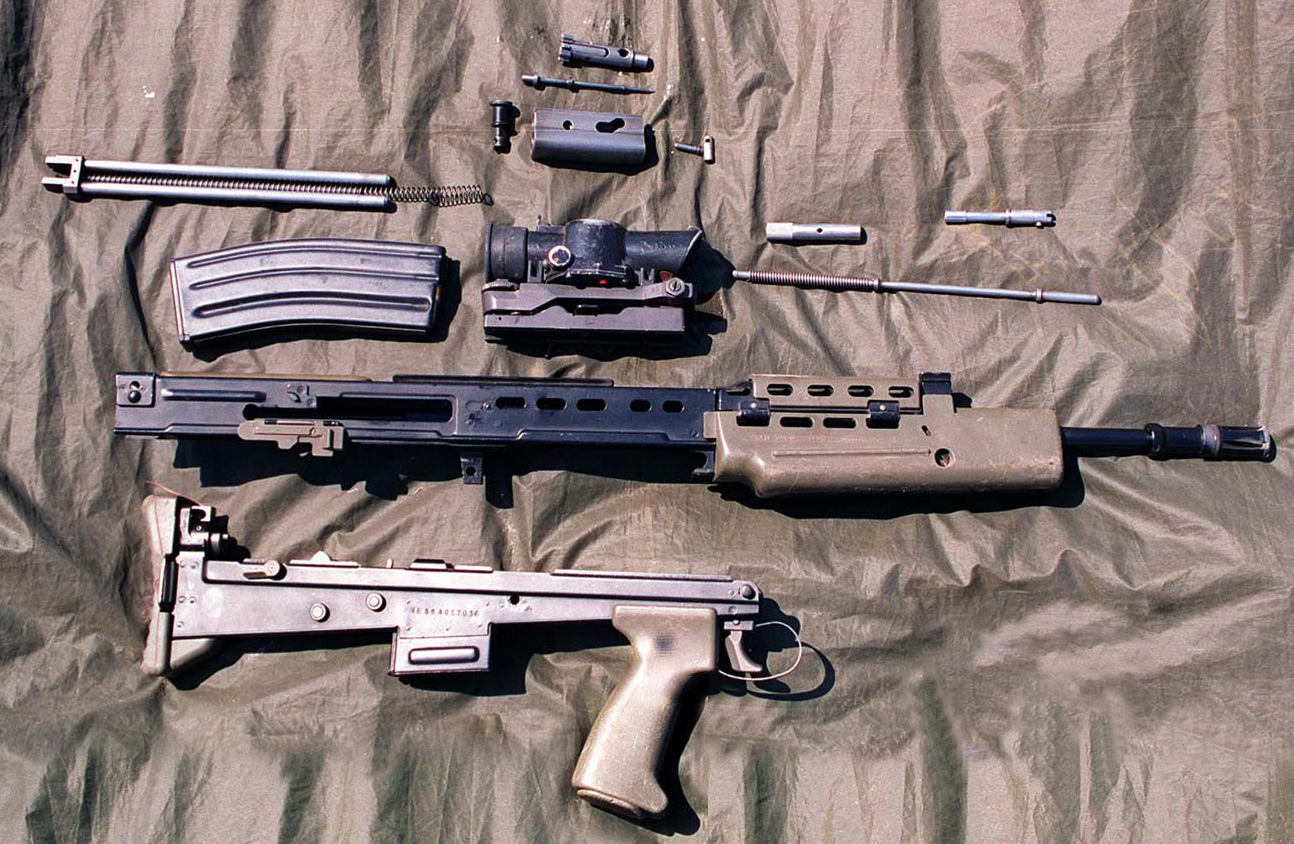
L85A1 fully-stripped

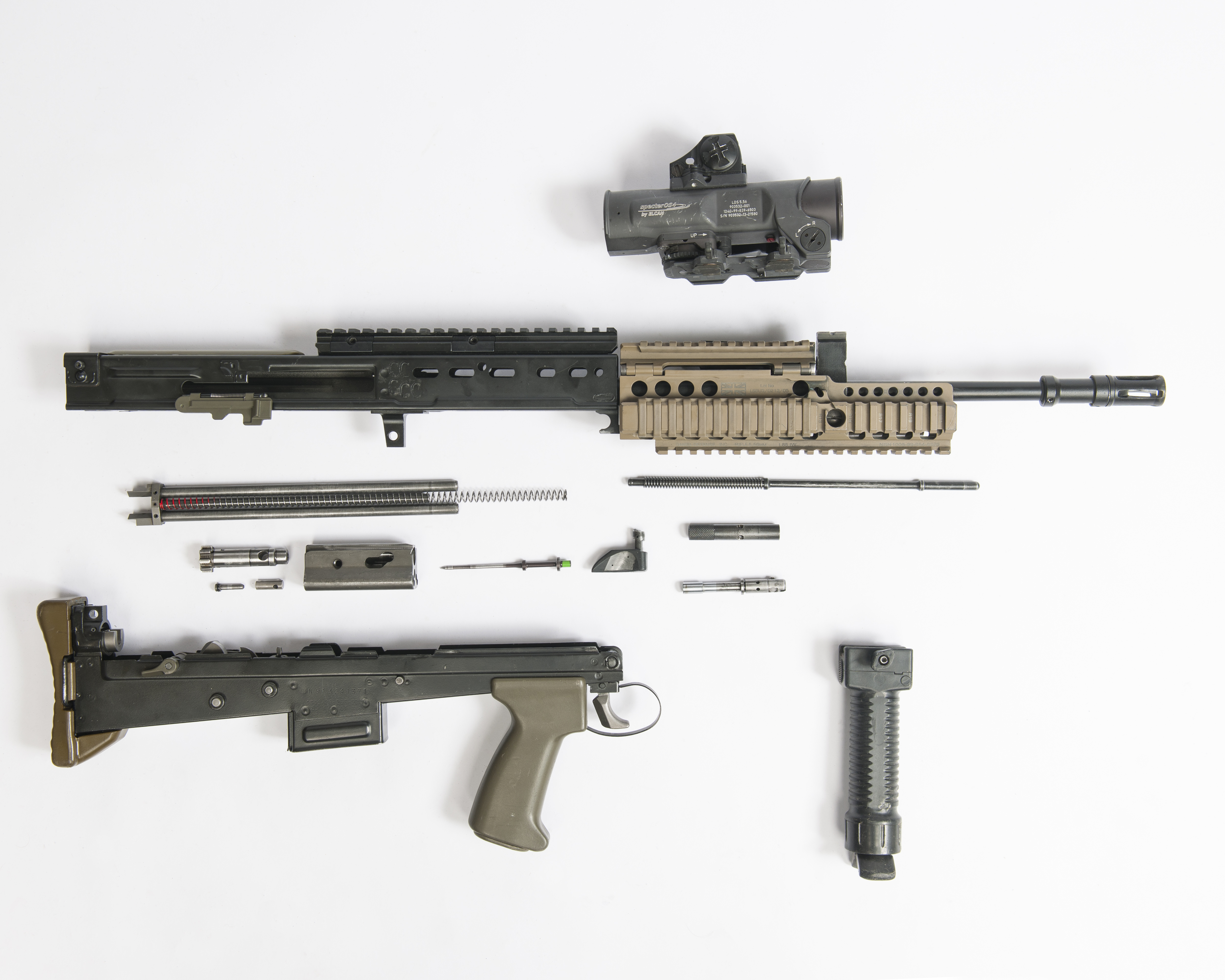
Fully-stripped L85A2 (post-2009 model)

After receiving feedback from users and incorporating the various design changes requested, including adapting the rifle for use with the heavier Belgian SS109 version of the 5.56×45mm round and improving reliability, the weapon system was accepted into service with the British Armed Forces in 1985 as the SA80. The SA80 family originally consisted of the L85A1 Rifle, the L86A1 Light Support Weapon (LSW), and L98A1 Cadet GP Rifle. The first weapons were issued in October 1985.

The SA80 family was designed and produced by the Royal Small Arms Factory at Enfield Lock. In 1988, production of the rifle was transferred to the Nottingham Small Arms Facility owned by Royal Ordnance (later British Aerospace, Royal Ordnance; now BAE Systems), the site was previously known as ROF Nottingham. It was envisaged that the family would replace the L1A1 SLR, the L2A3 (Sterling) submachine gun, the L4 Light Machine Gun (a modernised Bren), and the L7A2 General Purpose Machine Gun as used at section level. Regular infantry, Royal Marine units, and the RAF Regiment were to change over by 1987, remaining regular army units by 1990, remaining RAF units by 1991, Territorial Army units by 1991–1993, and the Royal Navy by 1993.

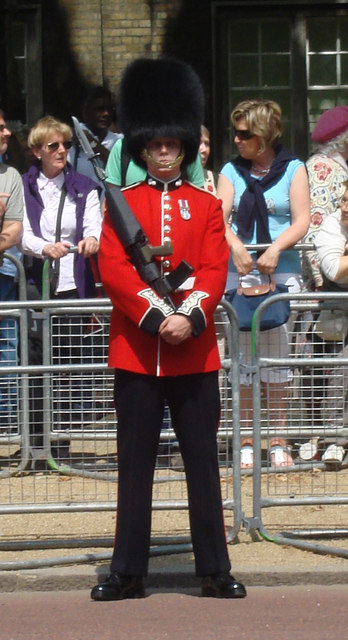
The "Stand Easy" drill position for the SA80, introduced because it was too short to rest the butt on the ground.

The introduction of the new rifle necessitated a change to the arms drill, since it was too short to rest the butt on the ground when at the "Stand at Ease" and "Stand Easy" positions. The "Slope Arms" was re-introduced to replace "Shoulder Arms", with frequent "Change Arms" orders required because of the weight of the weapon. The SA80 first appeared at the annual Trooping the Colour ceremony in June 1988.

In 1994, production was officially completed. More than 350,000 L85 rifles and L86 LSWs had been manufactured for the British Armed Forces, with the former variant accounting for 95% of the total run, with over 21,700 L98A1 rifles were produced for cadet use. The production line was broken up shortly afterwards, with the Nottingham facility closing in 2001. Upgrade programmes and requirements for spare and replacement parts have since been fulfilled by then British-owned Heckler & Koch, which later reopened the Nottingham site.

As responsibility for the funding and supply of the home defence regiments of the British Overseas Territories has been handed to the local governments of the territories, despite the regiments themselves coming under command of the national (British) government and being loosely integrated with the British Army, the SA80 was not automatically supplied to these units. The Bermuda Regiment (now the Royal Bermuda Regiment) adopted the Ruger Mini-14 in 1983, although small stocks of the L85 were also acquired for the purpose of familiarisation training as many of its personnel attend courses or attachments in Britain. The Regiment later acquired an additional 400 L85A2 rifles in 2015 to replace the Mini-14 as the standard-issue rifle.

The C is evidently still equipped with the L1A1 SLR. The Royal Gibraltar Regiment, which is more closely integrated with the British Army, adopted the SA80 from the outset. The Falkland Islands Defence Force adopted the Steyr AUG (another 5.56×45mm bullpup rifle) which served until 2019 when the Defence Force adopted the L85A2 as part of a wider effort to align its weapons, training and procedures with those of the British Armed Forces. It has not been adopted by the Cayman Islands Regiment formed in 2020 (which adopted the SIG Sauer SIG516) or the Turks and Caicos Islands Regiment that also formed in 2020 (and which has adopted the Colt M5 carbine).

The L85 has also been acquired by Commonwealth and foreign countries. It is in use with the Jamaica Defence Force. Various African and South American countries received SA80s as part of wider military aid packages.

=== Design flaws ===
Soon after its adoption into service, problems began to emerge during troop trials conducted between 1986 and 1987. Components were found to be insufficiently robust; the LSW's bipod lock often failed to hold the bipod legs in the closed position; the plastic furniture could be damaged by insect repellent; metal components were prone to rapid corrosion in jungle environments; and the weapon's mechanism proved highly susceptible to dusty and arctic conditions.

These problems were compounded by issues with the production process. The SA80 series was manufactured using metal stampings. While RSAF Enfield had previous experience of producing stamped-metal firearms, this was largely limited to weapons such as the Sten submachine gun, which used relatively loose manufacturing tolerances. The tighter tolerances required by the SA80 led to production delays and high levels of wastage. There were also concerns over working practices and employee attitudes at the Enfield site, which were exacerbated by its closure in 1988 and the resulting redundancies. One worker was quoted as saying: "Having been shafted by BAE and our own management, we thought why the hell should we care if [the SA80] worked or not. All we wanted to do was see the last of the bloody things and leave."

Although production at the Nottingham facility was intended to improve weapon quality through the use of modern manufacturing techniques, few employees there had prior experience of firearms manufacture. Only 15 to 20 components were produced in-house, compared with approximately 230 at the Enfield site, with the remainder outsourced to subcontractors. Because the plant maintained limited stocks of pre-produced components, significant delays occurred when subcontracted parts arrived late or failed to meet the required tolerances.

When the L85A1 and L86A1 first saw major combat during the Gulf War, their performance was considered inadequate. The L85A1 proved unreliable in semi-automatic fire and only marginally better in fully automatic fire, while the opposite was reported of the L86A1. Specific complaints included poor-quality plastic furniture that broke easily; damage to the weapon during normal use; a magazine release catch that could be accidentally operated; a weak top cover catch over the gas mechanism that frequently opened and required taping shut; magazines that could only reliably be loaded with 26–28 rounds due to weak springs, a problem also noted in training manuals in relation to earlier Colt-produced magazines; and the need for frequent cleaning and inspection of magazine lips for damage.

The aluminium magazine could deform if gripped too tightly, restricting the feed of ammunition and causing stoppages. The LSW had a limited magazine capacity for its intended role and overheated after 120–150 rounds fired in bursts. Both weapons were difficult to strip and reassemble, with the gas plug liable to seize and requiring removal by an armourer. Other reported faults included fragile firing pins that could break; a flat rear trigger surface that could become obstructed by snow or dirt, preventing the weapon from firing; and ergonomic issues concerning the safety catch, cocking lever, and the position and stiffness of the fire selector switch.

During Operation Palliser and other intervention operations in Sierra Leone, it was discovered that the safety plunger fitted to production weapons was made from inexpensive injection-moulded plastic that could swell when wet, potentially rendering weapons inoperable if left on the 'safe' setting. The SA80 initially gained a poor reputation among British soldiers as unreliable and fragile, a view that was subsequently reflected in the UK media, the entertainment industry, and members of the House of Lords. Special Air Service sergeant Chris Ryan described the SA80 as "poor-quality, unreliable weapons at the best of times, prone to stoppages, and it seemed pretty tough to have to rely on them".

Immediately after the Gulf War, (Note: the British activities named Operation Granby) the Ministry of Defence (MOD) commissioned the LANDSET Report, (Note: officially entitled "Equipment Performance (SA80) During Operation Granby (The Gulf War)") examining the effectiveness of the L85A1 and L86A1. The report criticised the weapon's acceptance into service. Neither weapon had passed the sand trials, and both experienced frequent stoppages. The mechanisms required heavy lubrication to prevent seizure when fired "dry"; however, in sandy environments, the lubricant attracted abrasive particles into the mechanism, further reducing reliability. The LANDSET Report identified more than 50 faults, including the easily operated magazine release catch, which could be caught on clothing and accidentally release the magazine; the plastic safety plunger, which became brittle in cold climates; and firing pins that were unsuitable for repeated use and prone to fracture during automatic fire.

The report concluded: "It is, however, quite clear that infantrymen did not have CONFIDENCE in their personal weapon. Most expected a stoppage in the first magazine fired. Some platoon commanders considered that casualties would have occurred due to weapon stoppages if the enemy had put up any resistance in the trench and bunker clearing operations. Even discounting the familiarisation period of desert conditions, when some may have still been using the incorrect lubrication drill, stoppages continued to occur."

The report was leaked to the press, after which the Ministry of Defence claimed it was a forgery. Although the MOD later acknowledged that the document was genuine, it continued to downplay its significance. Only seven of the 50 faults identified were addressed through subsequent modifications, and complaints about reliability continued. The MOD finally began to address the SA80 family's problems seriously in 1992, but procuring a completely new weapon was considered too costly.

=== A2 upgrade programme ===
As a result, a more extensive modification programme was executed. In 2000, a team from Heckler & Koch, led by Ernst Mauch, was contracted to upgrade the SA80 family of weapons. At that time, Heckler & Koch were owned by BAE Systems. 200,000 SA80s were re-manufactured for £400 each, producing the A2 variant. Changes focused primarily on improving reliability and include a redesigned cocking handle, modified bolt, extractor and a redesigned hammer assembly that produces a slight delay in the hammer's operation in continuous fire mode, improving reliability and stability. The rifle and the LSW underwent modifications, and the programme also saw the introduction of a carbine variant. The Ministry of Defence describes the A2 revision as "producing the most reliable weapons of their type in the world". Armed Forces trials indicated extremely good reliability over a range of climates for various operational scenarios, though with a decline in reliability in hot, and especially hot and dry conditions.

The L85A2 achieved an average reliability rate of 25,200 mean rounds between failure, and the L86A2 achieved 12,897 mean rounds between failures. Both weapons have higher reliability rates in cold/dry, temperate, and hot/wet conditions, (Note: over 31,500 MRBF for L85A2) but lower rates in hot/dry environments. The minimum expected life of A2 components is 10,000 rounds, meaning they might never suffer stoppages during their lifetimes. Mean rounds between failures was the measure of the average number of rounds that are fired between failures of a battlefield mission test. A battlefield mission was counted as a failure when there was more than one stoppage that the soldier could clear immediately on their own or there was a stoppage that required an armourer or a tool to clear. The Individual Weapon fired 165 battlefield missions, each comprising 150 rounds over 8 mins 40 secs. A total of 24,750 rounds were fired and suffered only 51 stoppages. (Note: 485 rounds fired for every stoppage) Out of 165 battlefield missions, the A2 passed 156; the nine failures stoppages were easily cleared and not mission critical. The L85A2 achieved a 95% success rate, above the operational requirement of 90%, and its nearest rival of popular choice achieved only 47%. Originally slated for introduction in 2002, the first A2-style SA80 weapons were rushed into action in Afghanistan in December 2001, and all 200,000 were converted by February 2006. Three to four thousand weapons were converted per month. Despite the modifications, reports emerged that the L85A2 was still jamming; in reality, there were few jams and problems were much less serious than they were made out to be, since they stemmed from isolated cases of soldiers not cleaning their weapons correctly. The modified A2 variants are distinguished by the "HK A2" marking on the top of the weapon just forward of the buttplate and the distinctive comma-shaped cocking handle (shaped to aid the ejection of the empty round casing and prevent stoppages).

Continued testing of the L85A2 in adverse conditions demonstrates its reliability over contemporary rifles, including the M16. Although it is heavier than most conventional and more modern bullpup rifles, its full-length barrel gives higher muzzle velocities and better terminal performance than both the American M4 carbine and M16 assault rifle. Rounds from an M4 will only reliably fragment out to 50–100 metres, while the L85A2 and M16 allowed fragmentation out to 150–200 metres and the L86A2 has an even longer fragmentation range. Despite these modifications, the L86A2 was supplemented with a belt-fed machine gun. British troops were issued with FN Minimi machine guns to add suppressive fire out to 300 metres.

A further upgrade including the provision of Advanced Combat Optical Gunsights (ACOGs), a Daniel Defense-designed Picatinny rail (RIS) handguard for the L85 rifle (with optional Grip Pod downgrip), and a new vortex style flash eliminator was introduced as an Urgent Operational Requirement; initially introduced for use by selected units in 2007, the upgrade package was subsequently rolled out on a more general basis from 2009 onwards.

=== A3 upgrade programme ===
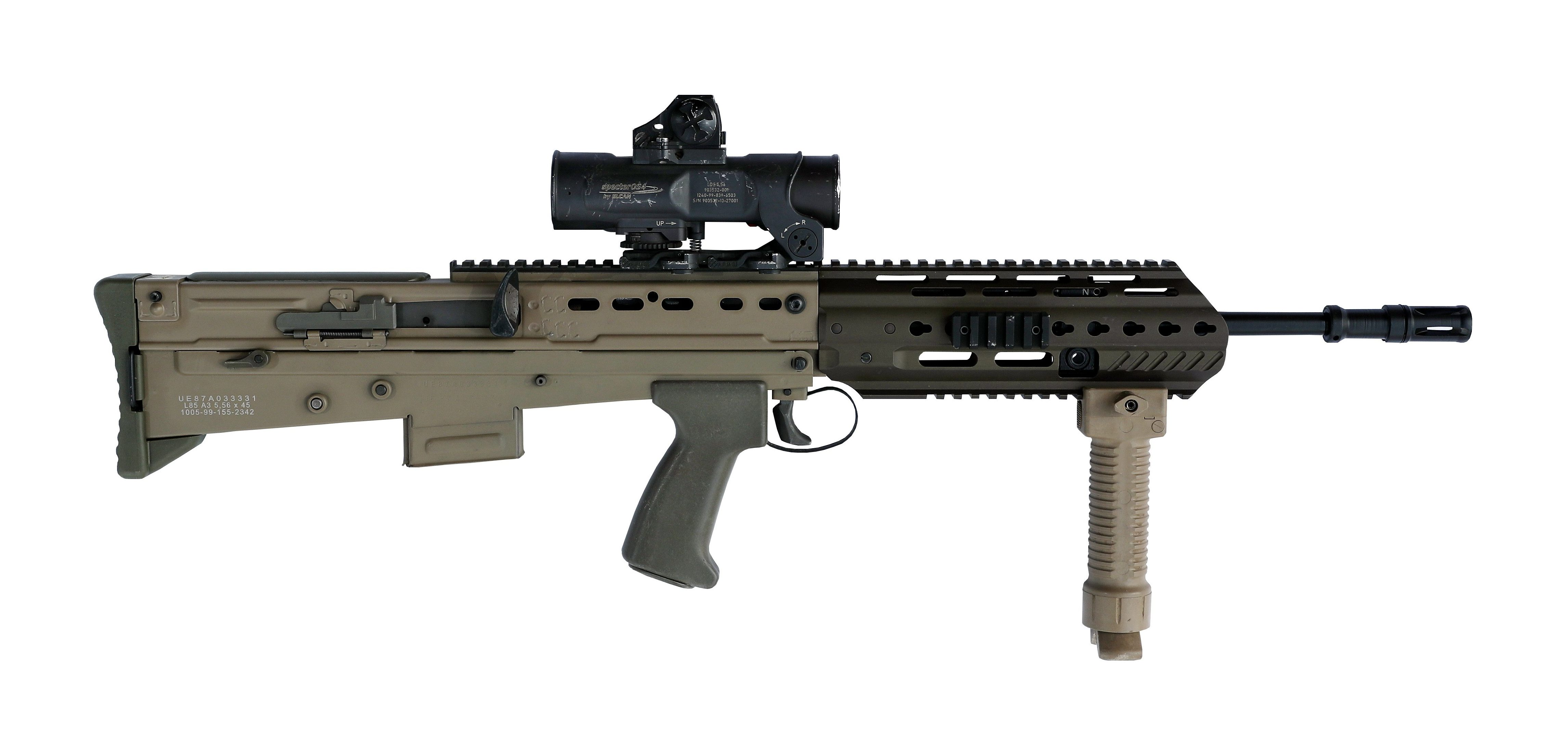
L85A3 with a vertical fore grip

The L85A3 was first unveiled in prototype form in September 2016 with working models on display in September 2017 at the Defence and Security Equipment International event and official adoption taking place in 2018. The changes from the SA80A2 design include a modification to the upper receiver and a full-length rail system for optional add-ons such as a vertical foregrip, laser pointer and torch. It also includes a weight saving of 100 g and a new Flat Dark Earth coating offering improved durability and better camouflage across various environments. The Mid Life Improvement (MLI) project received an initial investment of £5.4 million to have 5,000 weapons upgraded initially, with plans for more weapons to be upgraded in the future. The MLI project should see the weapon in service with the British military beyond 2025. Only the L85 rifle was announced as being upgraded; the L86 LSW would be withdrawn from use. The A3 received further upgrades in late 2020 following feedback from soldiers. These upgrades mainly included improvements to the ergonomics of the handguard and a switch from Heckler & Koch's HKey accessory attachment system to Magpul's M-LOK.

An initiative to find a replacement for the SA80 family, known as Project Grayburn, was in the concept phase in 2025, and is expected to enter the assessment phase in 2026.

== Design details ==
=== Operating mechanism ===
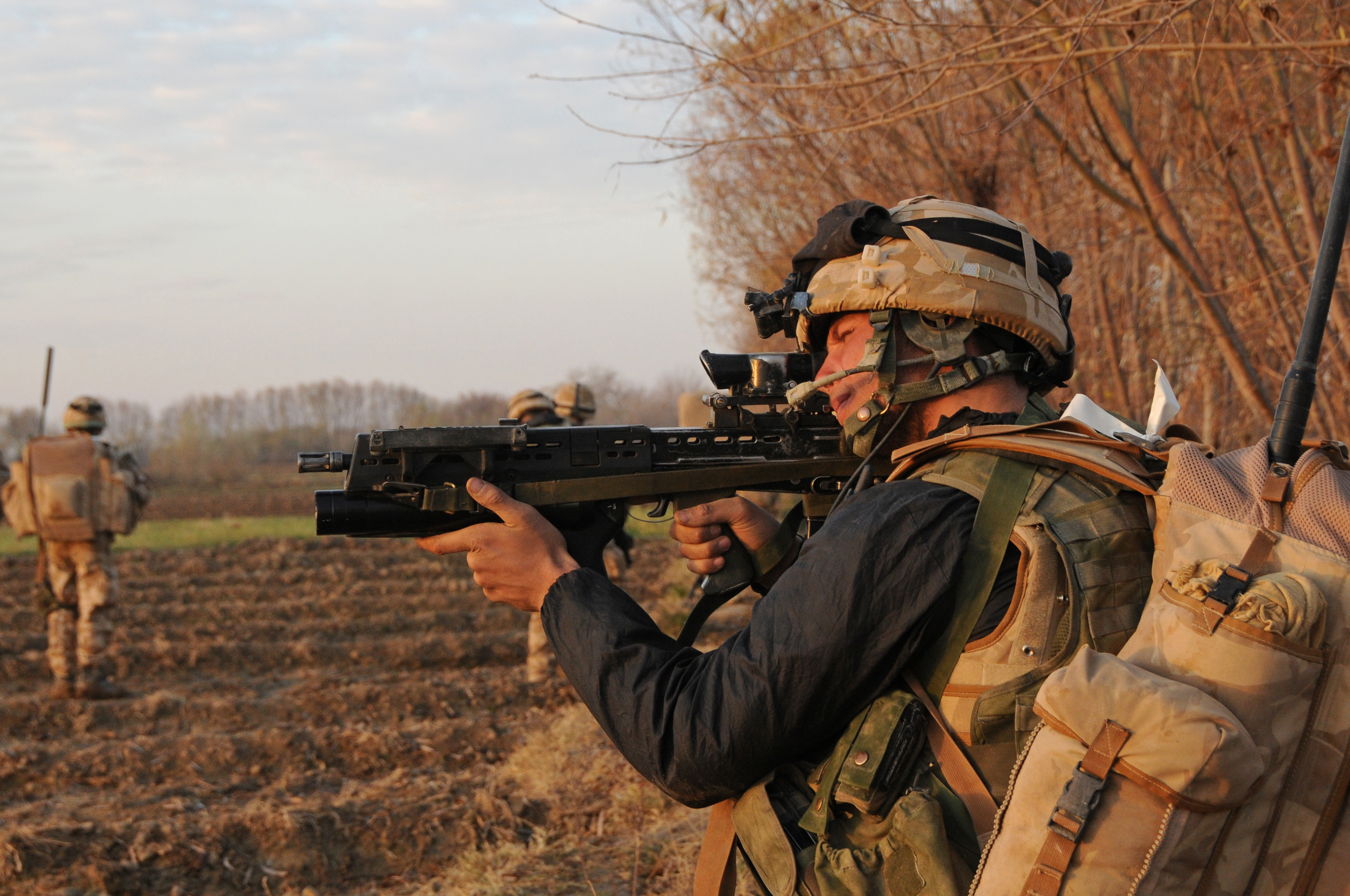
A Royal Marine aims an L85A2 equipped with an L123A2 Heckler & Koch AG36 grenade launcher.

The SA80 system is a selective fire gas-operated design that uses ignited powder gases bled through a port in the barrel to provide the weapon's automation. The rifle uses a short-stroke gas piston system located above the barrel, which is fed gas through a three-position adjustable gas regulator. The first gas setting is used for normal operation, the second ("Excess") is for use in difficult environmental conditions, while the third setting ("Off") prevents any gas from reaching the piston and is used to launch rifle grenades. The weapon uses a rotating cylindrical bolt that contains seven radially mounted locking splines, an extractor and casing ejector. The bolt's rotation is controlled by a cam stud that slides inside a helical camming guide machined into the bolt carrier.

=== Features ===
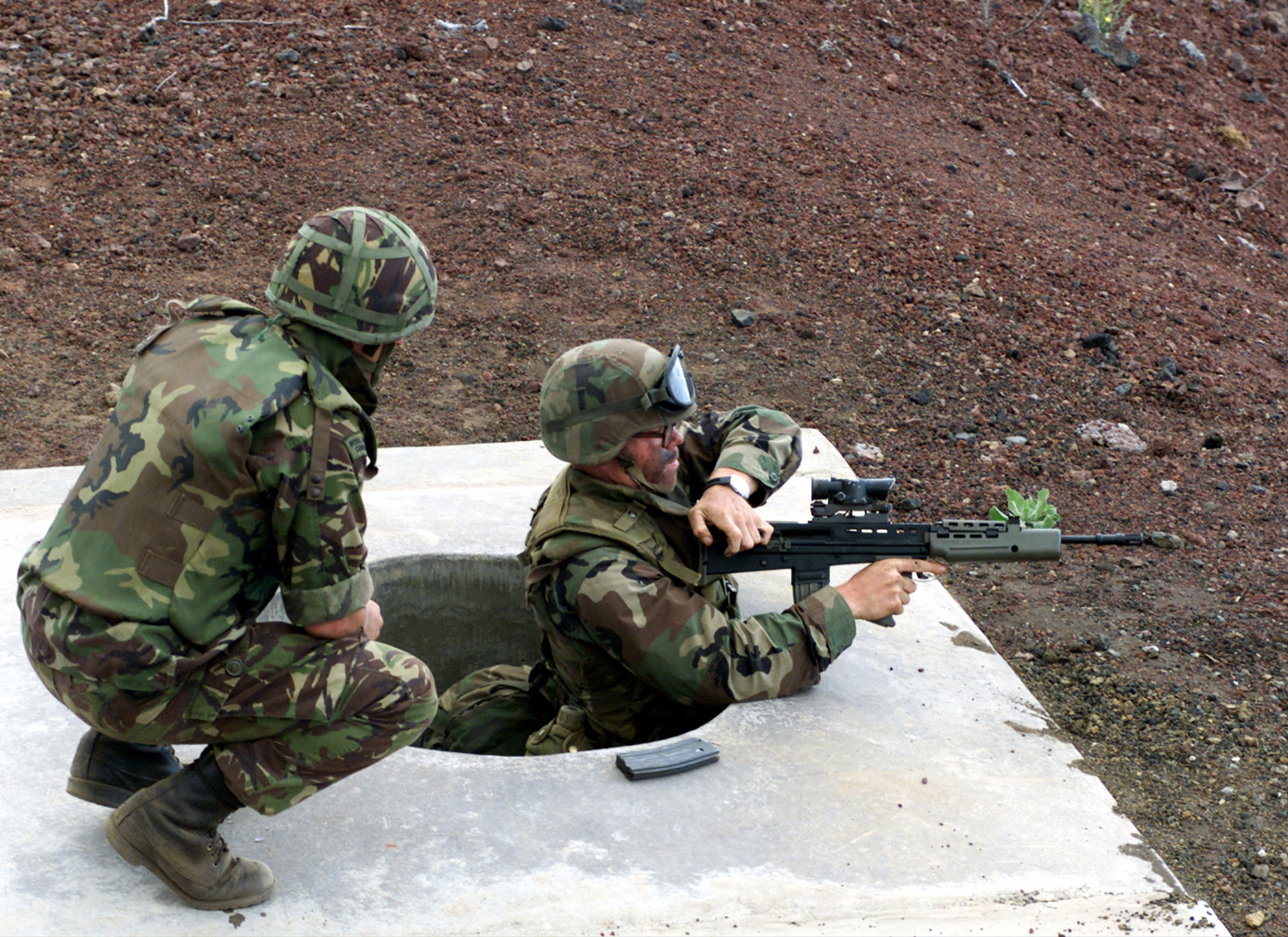
A US Marine operating the cocking handle of an L85A1, 2000.

The family is built in a bullpup layout (the action is behind the trigger group), with a forward-mounted pistol grip. The main advantage of this type of arrangement is the overall compactness of the weapon, which can be achieved without compromising the barrel length, hence the overall length of the L85 rifle is shorter than a carbine, but the barrel length is that of an assault rifle. While left-handed conversion kits were trialled, the weapon as finally issued must be used exclusively right-handed since the ejection port and cocking handle (which reciprocates during firing) are on the right side of the receiver, making aimed fire from the left shoulder difficult. This can also give rise to a tactical disadvantage when firing around the left side of cover, where the shooter must expose the majority of their body. However, left shoulder firing can be achieved by tilting the right side of the rifle downwards, reducing the impediments of the cocking handle and the ejection port; the MOD also maintains that left-handed soldiers are capable of accurately firing the weapon from the right shoulder.

The SA80 family is hammer-fired and has a trigger mechanism with a fire-control selector that enables semi-automatic/repetition and fully automatic fire (the fire selector lever is located at the left side of the receiver, just aft of the magazine). A cross bolt type safety prevents accidental firing and is located above the trigger; the "safe" setting blocks the movement of the trigger. The magazine release button is placed above the magazine housing, on the left side of the receiver. When the last cartridge is fired from the magazine, the bolt and bolt carrier assembly lock to the rear. To release the bolt, the user has to press a black button on the left side of the rifle, near the fire selector.

The SA80 barrel features a flash eliminator, which serves as a mounting base for attaching a blank firing attachment; it also allows for the use of rifle grenades or a bayonet with the rifle variant.

The weapon's receiver is made from stamped sheet steel, reinforced with welded and riveted machined steel inserts. Synthetic materials, such as nylon, were used to fabricate the furniture and the safety plunger.

=== Sights ===
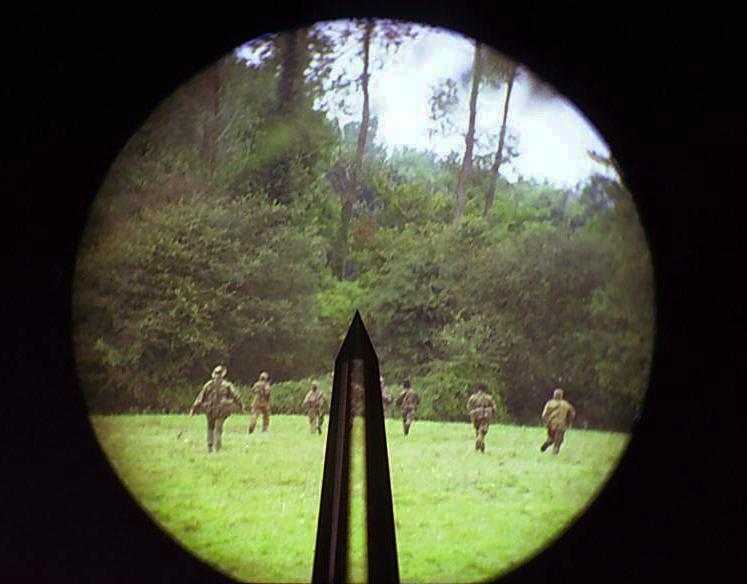
A view through a SUSAT sight.

Initially, rifles used by the Royal Marines, British Army infantry soldiers (and other soldiers with a dismounted close combat role) and the RAF Regiment were equipped with a SUSAT (Sight Unit Small Arms, Trilux) optical sight, with a fixed 4× magnification and an illuminated aiming pointer powered by a variable tritium light source (as of 2006, almost all British Army personnel deployed on operations have been issued SUSATs); this is also the standard sighting arrangement for the LSW variant. Mounted on the SUSAT's one-piece, pressure die-cast aluminium body are a set of back-up iron sights that consist of a front blade and small rear aperture. Rifles used with other branches of the armed forces when not on operations are configured with fixed iron sights, consisting of a flip rear aperture housed inside the carrying handle and a forward post vertical blade foresight, installed on a bracket above the gas block. The rear sight can be adjusted for windage, and the foresight—elevation. In place of the SUSAT, a passive night vision CWS scope can be used.

More recently, weapons used by some Royal Marines, Infantry, RAF Regiment, Ministry of Defence Police and soldiers with a dismounted close combat role in operations in Afghanistan have had the SUSAT replaced with the Trijicon Advanced Combat Optical Gunsight (ACOG). In 2011, the Ministry of Defence began issuing ELCAN SpecterOS 4× Lightweight Day Sights (LDS) in an effort to replace ageing SUSAT units across the British Armed Forces, forming the first stage of the FIST infantry enhancement project. In order to mount the new sight, the weapon has been provided with an adapter to convert the existing sight rail to the Picatinny standard, in keeping with the updated handguard. The FIST project has also seen upgrades to the existing Qioptiq CWS (4×) and Maxi-Kite (6×) night vision scopes, and the introduction of the FIST Thermal Sight, following operational experience with the VIPIR-2+ thermal weapon sight in Afghanistan. All of the new FIST weapon sights have the capacity to accept Shield's Close Quarter Battlesight reflex sight.

=== Magazines ===
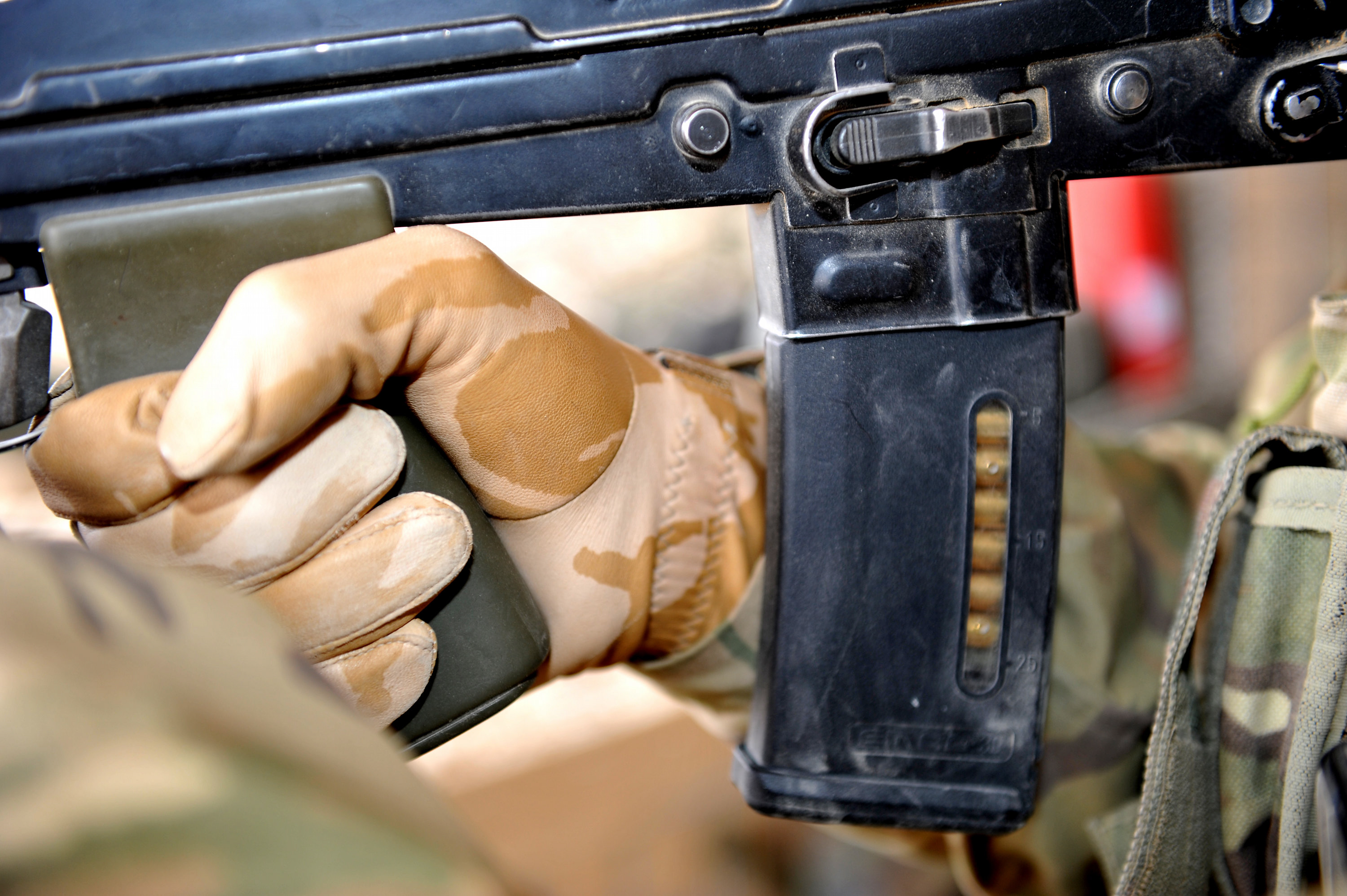
A close-up of an L85A2 with the polymer Magpul EMAG. Note the clear round counting window.

SA80 weapons are fed from a STANAG magazine, usually with a 30-round capacity. Initially issued magazines were aluminium Colt magazines which were not particularly robust, leading to a steel replacement being produced by ROF Radway Green. These magazines were then replaced during the A2 upgrade programme with two new steel magazines by Heckler & Koch; the main variant is for live ammunition, and the other is exclusively used for blank ammunition. The blank variant is identified by yellow stripes on the magazine, and is designed to prevent the unintentional loading of live rounds. This magazine has less internal length so that live rounds will not fit, while still fitting blank rounds, which are shorter. Blank rounds will fit into the live-round magazine, but the difference in length increases the chance of a stoppage. The Magpul Industries polymer EMAG magazine was introduced from 2011, featuring a lower weight of 130 grams (4.6 oz) compared to the steel magazine's 249 grams (8.8 oz), a detachable dust cover, and a clear window in the magazine body that allows easy monitoring of how much ammunition remains in the magazine. The Beta C-Mag was trialled in an attempt to improve the L86's limited ability to lay down sustained fire, but reliability problems with the magazine when loaded with British-issue ammunition meant that it was not adopted.

=== Bayonet ===
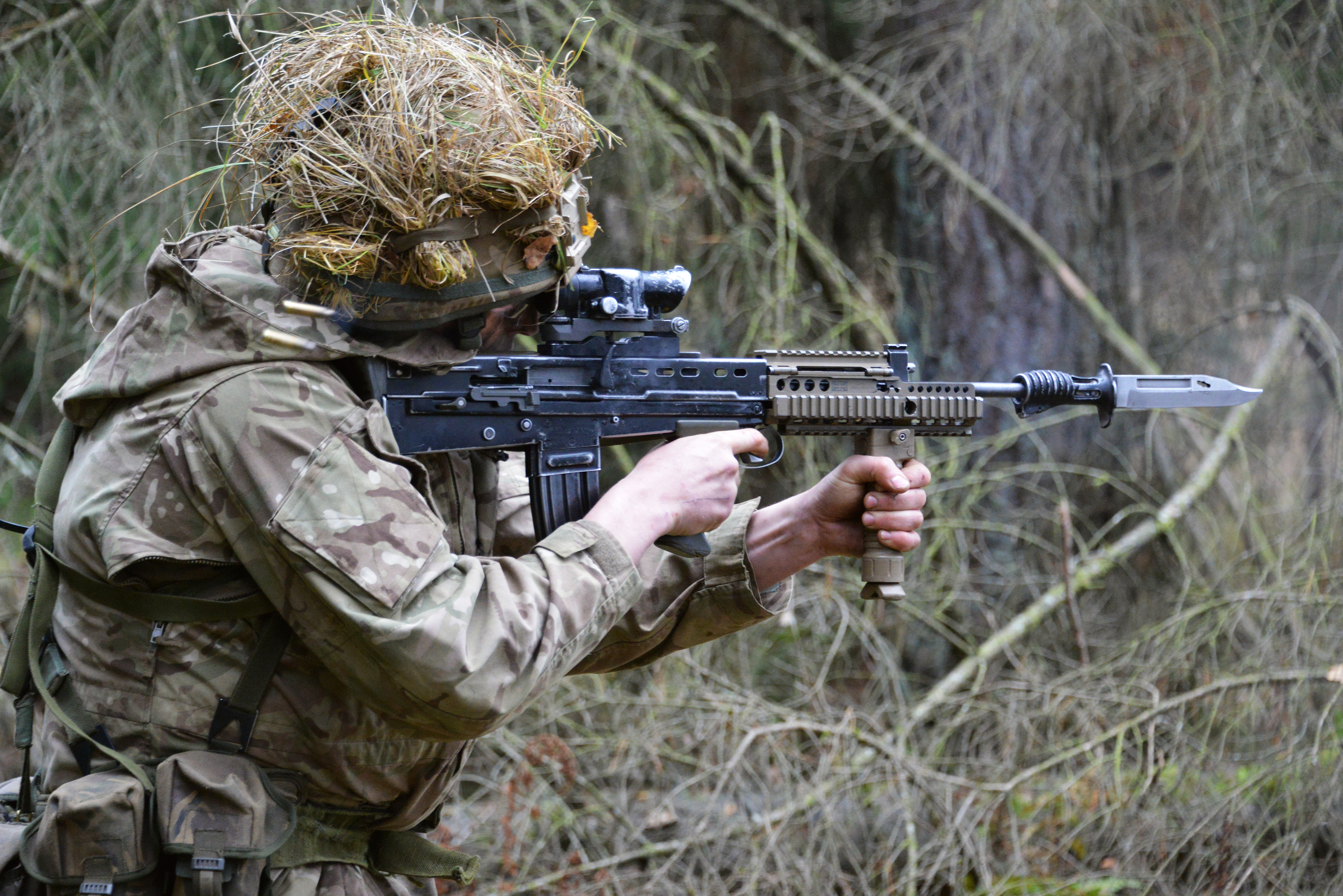
A bayonet attached to an L85A2 rifle

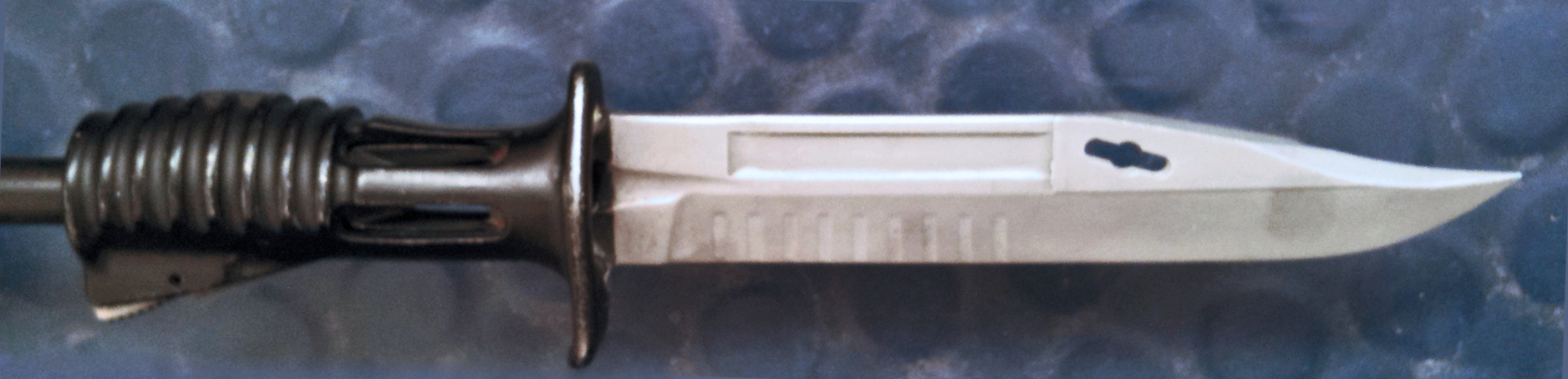
Bayonet detail

In British Armed Forces use, the L85 Rifle is issued with the socket-type L3A1 Bayonet, which has a hollow handle that fits onto the muzzle. The blade is offset to the side of the handle to allow the rifle to be fired while the bayonet is fitted. It is shaped to produce good penetration when thrust and to part a person's ribs without embedding into bone, and a ribbed section for rope cutting. The bayonet handle is shaped so as to allow the bayonet to be used as a fighting knife in its own right. The issued scabbard features a saw blade for use on wood, a sharpening stone to hone the bayonet, and a bottle opener. When combined with the bayonet, it also forms a wire cutter.

When soldiers from the Princess of Wales's Royal Regiment went into battle with fixed bayonets on their SA80s during the Battle of Al Amara in Iraq on 14 May 2004, it was the first time fixed bayonets had been used by British troops since the Falklands War. On several occasions, fixed bayonets were used during the Afghanistan conflict. The bayonet cannot be fitted to the L22 Carbine or L86 Light Support Weapon. As a result, soldiers equipped with the latter sometimes swapped their weapons for vehicle crewmen's L85s when clearing trenches during Operation Granby.

=== Accessories ===
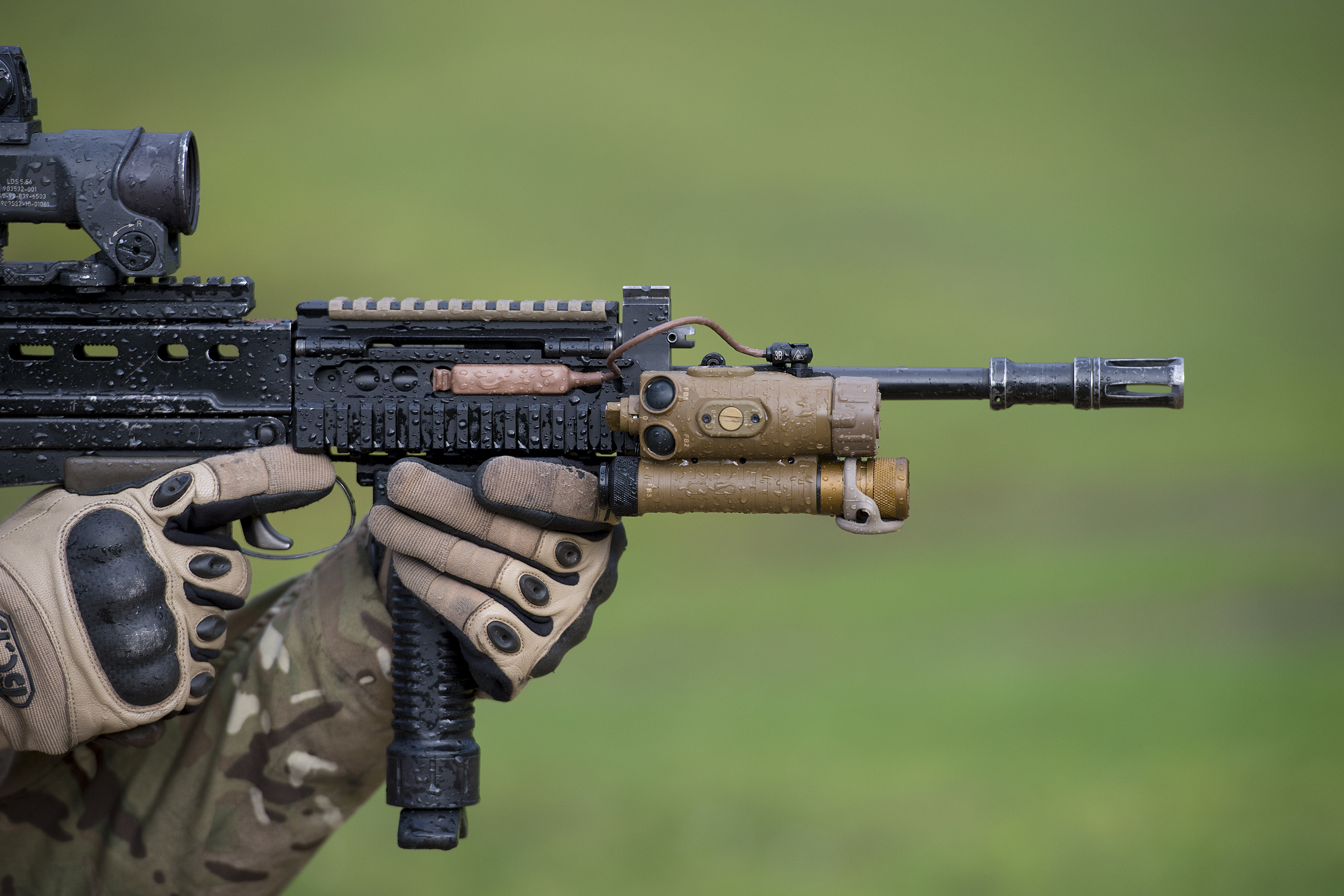
L85A2 carrying upgraded Laser Light Module Mk 3 with 800 m range.

The SA80 is supplied with a sling, blank-firing adaptor, and cleaning kit. The rifle can be adapted to use .22 Long Rifle training ammunition with a special conversion kit. The Small Arms Weapons Effects Simulator can be used on the L85 when in training with blank ammunition. On operations with ground close combat units (Infantry, Royal Marines, RAF Regiment), the rifle is often fitted with an LLM01 Laser Light Module and deployable bipod mounted within an optional front grip.

== Variants ==
There are four main variants that make up the SA80 family: the L85 Rifle, the L86 Light Support Weapon, the L22 Carbine and the L98 Cadet General Purpose Rifle.

=== Rifle ===
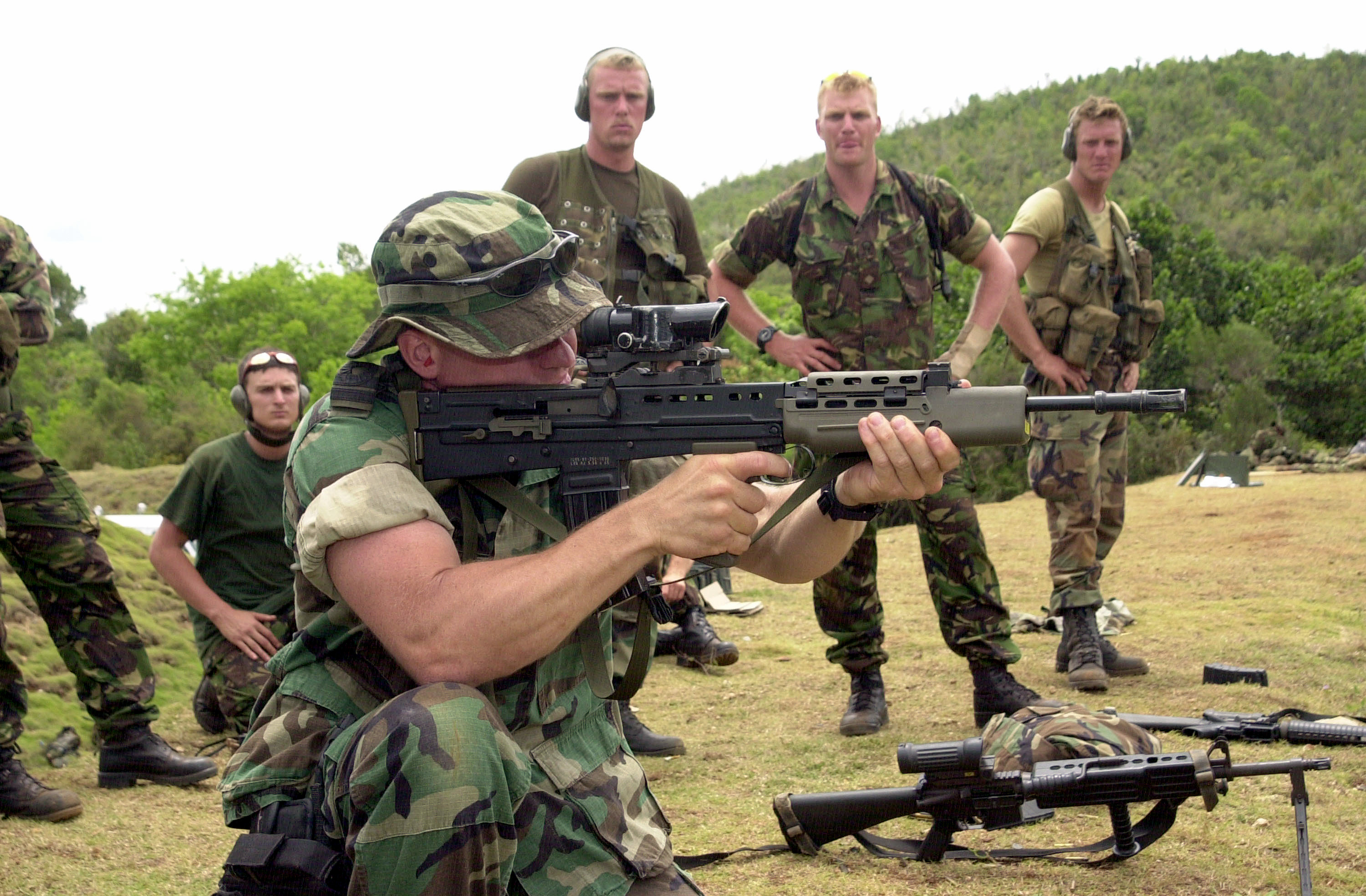
Royal Netherlands Marine Corps captain aiming an L85A2 with SUSAT and polymer handguard

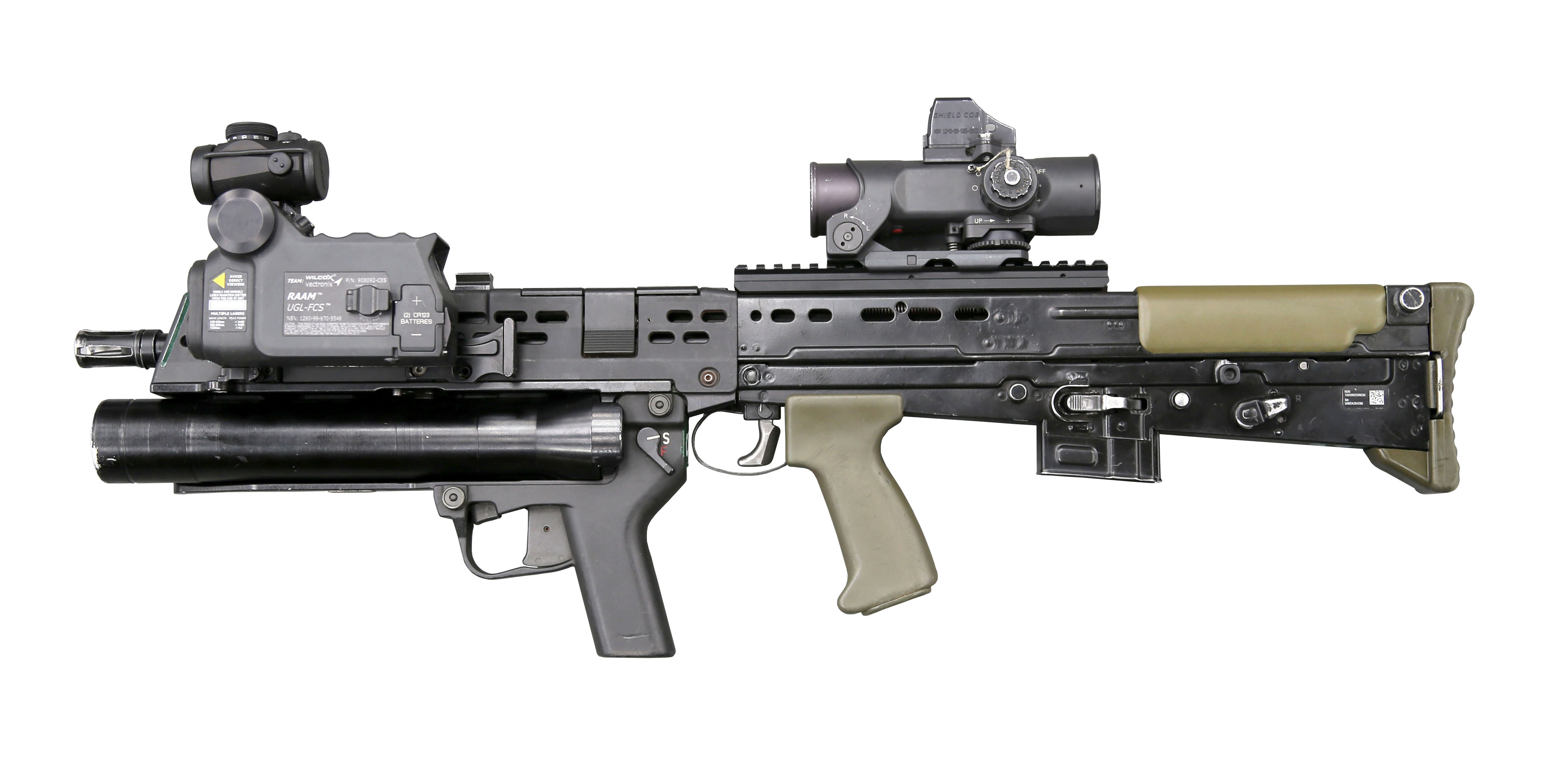
L85A2 with Elcan LDS and L123 UGL, including Rapid Acquisition Aiming Module

The L85 Rifle, also occasionally referred to as the L85 Individual Weapon (IW), is the standard rifle of the British Armed Forces.

When initially adopted for service, the L85's grenade-launching capability was provided by conventional rifle grenades, specifically the L74A1 high-explosive anti-tank (HEAT) and L75A1 HEAT-APERS variants of the Luchaire grenade. After these suffered from problems with premature detonation, the L85A1 HE grenade was adopted as a replacement. Several underbarrel grenade launcher designs were trialled, including the M203 and the proprietary "Enfield Close Assault Weapon" developed by Royal Ordnance. It was eventually decided to adopt the L17A2/L123 40mm Underslung Grenade Launcher (UGL). This is issued at a scale of one per fireteam and can fire fragmentation, high-explosive dual-purpose (HEDP), red phosphorus, white illuminating parachute, infra-red illuminating parachute, practice and drill ammunition, with buckshot ammunition also intended for adoption. The addition of the UGL increases the L85A2's weight by 1.12 kg.

=== Light Support Weapon ===
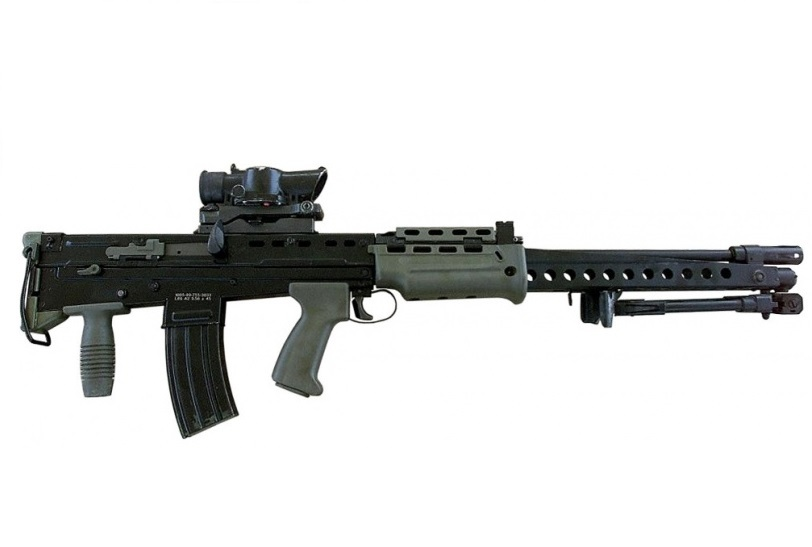
L86A2 LSW

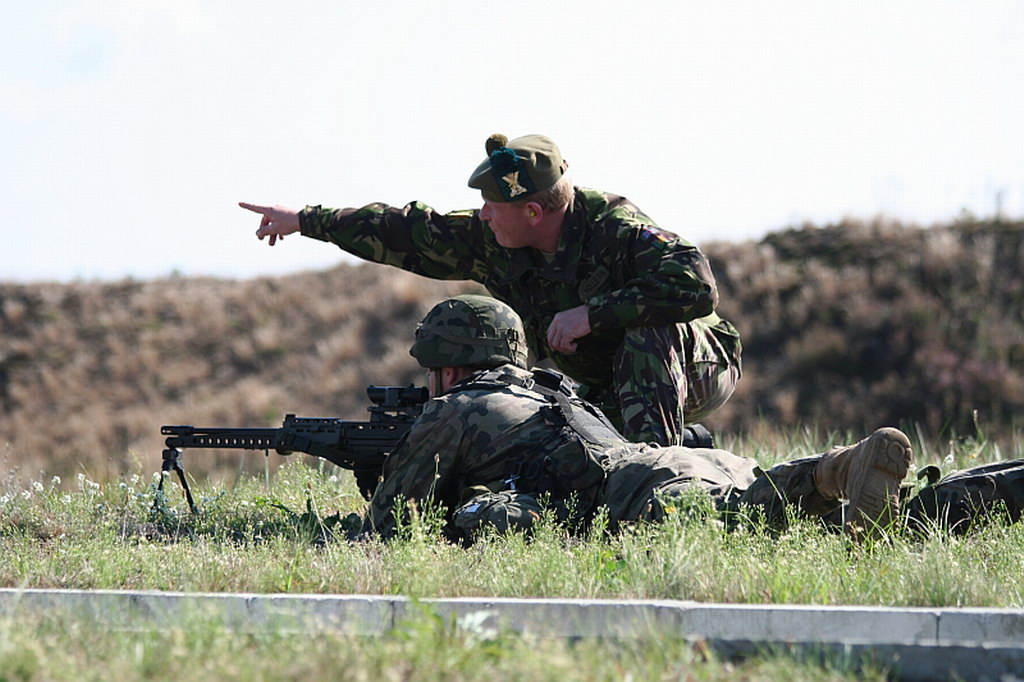
British soldier providing instruction on the L86 to a Polish serviceman during the 2008 Kozacki Step exercises

The L86 Light Support Weapon (LSW) is a magazine-fed squad automatic weapon originally intended to provide fire support at the fireteam level. It has a heavier and longer 646-millimetre (25.4 in) barrel than the rifle and features a shorter handguard with an integrated bipod extending from the front. The stock incorporates a shoulder strap to support the weapon's weight when firing from the prone position, while a rear vertical grip provides improved control during burst fire. Otherwise, the weapon is identical to the L85 rifle on which it is based, and uses the same magazines and sighting systems. In addition to service with the British Armed Forces, the LSW was adopted by MOD-sponsored cadet organisations.

The longer barrel, bipod and optical performance of the SUSAT sight gave the weapon excellent accuracy, increased muzzle velocity and greater effective range. From its introduction, however, the LSW attracted criticism similar to that directed at the L85 rifle. It also suffered from the limitation of being unable to provide sustained automatic fire because it lacked a belt feed system. This is a common issue with light support weapons derived from rifles, such as the heavy-barrelled FN FAL.

The LSW was originally intended to replace the L7A2 GPMG at section level, but its shortcomings led many units to retain the GPMG or return to using it. The role was eventually filled by the FN Minimi, known in British service as the L110A1-A3 light machine gun, a belt-fed weapon with a quick-change barrel similar to the GPMG. Owing to its high accuracy in semi-automatic fire, the L86's primary role shifted to that of a designated marksman rifle after the introduction of the L110A1. It was subsequently replaced in this role by the L129A1 Sharpshooter Rifle. The L86 was withdrawn from service in 2019.

=== L22 Carbine ===
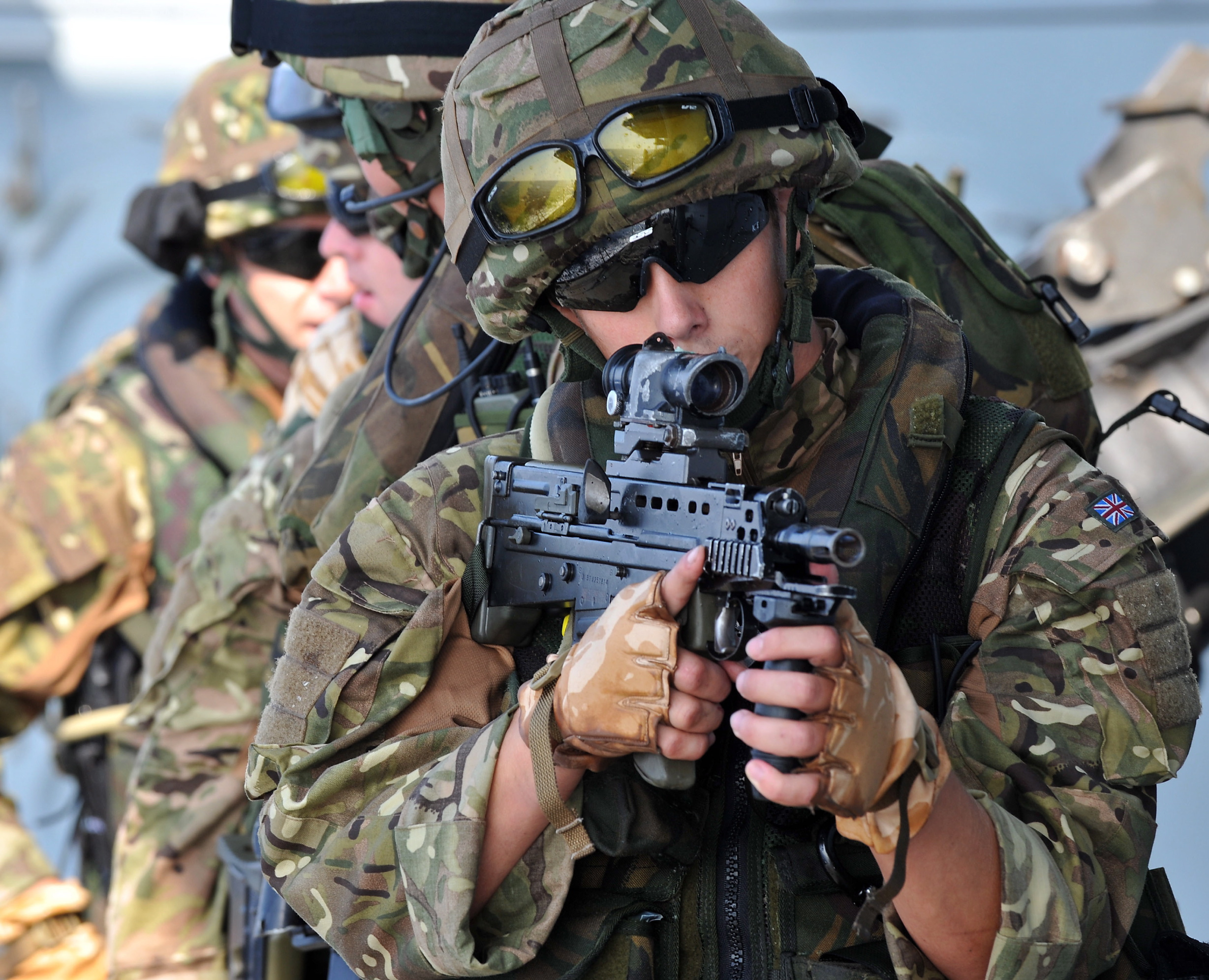
Royal Marines boarding team member with an L22 Carbine

The compactness provided by the SA80's bullpup design meant that no carbine variant was initially planned. By 1984, however, an extremely short prototype had been developed. Its barrel ended immediately in front of the pistol grip, and the absence of a foregrip or handguard created a risk of self-inflicted injuries if the firer's supporting hand slipped forward. Two further prototypes were produced in 1989 and 1994. The 1989 model was slightly longer than the earlier design, with an overall length of 556 mm (21.9 in), a 289 mm (11.4 in) barrel and the rear grip from the LSW used as a foregrip. The 1994 prototype used a 17.4-inch barrel (442 mm), had an overall length of 709 mm (27.9 in) and used the LSW handguard.

The fourth attempt (2003–2004) was the only one to be officially adopted and became known as the L22 Carbine in British service. It resembles the 1989 prototype, including the foregrip, which was redesigned as an adjustable component. The weapon was built to A2 standards and has a 318 mm (12.5 in) barrel and an overall length of 565 mm. Approximately 1,500 were converted from surplus L86 LSWs, with further production increasing the total to around 2,000. The shorter barrel reduces accuracy compared with the rifle variant, particularly at longer ranges. The official manual gives an effective range of 200 m, while noting that performance beyond this depends largely on the firer's skill.

The version accepted for service was introduced during the A2 upgrade programme—although official documentation differs over whether it should be designated the L22A1 or L22A2. It was initially issued to tank and armoured vehicle crews as a personal defence weapon for emergency use outside vehicles. Its compact size has also resulted in its adoption by the Royal Marines Fleet Protection Group, helicopter pilots, armoured fighting vehicle crews and dog handlers across all three services.

Twenty-round STANAG magazines were introduced to provide a more compact weapon for use in AFVs and other vehicles, although standard 30-round magazines remain compatible.

=== Cadet General Purpose Rifle ===
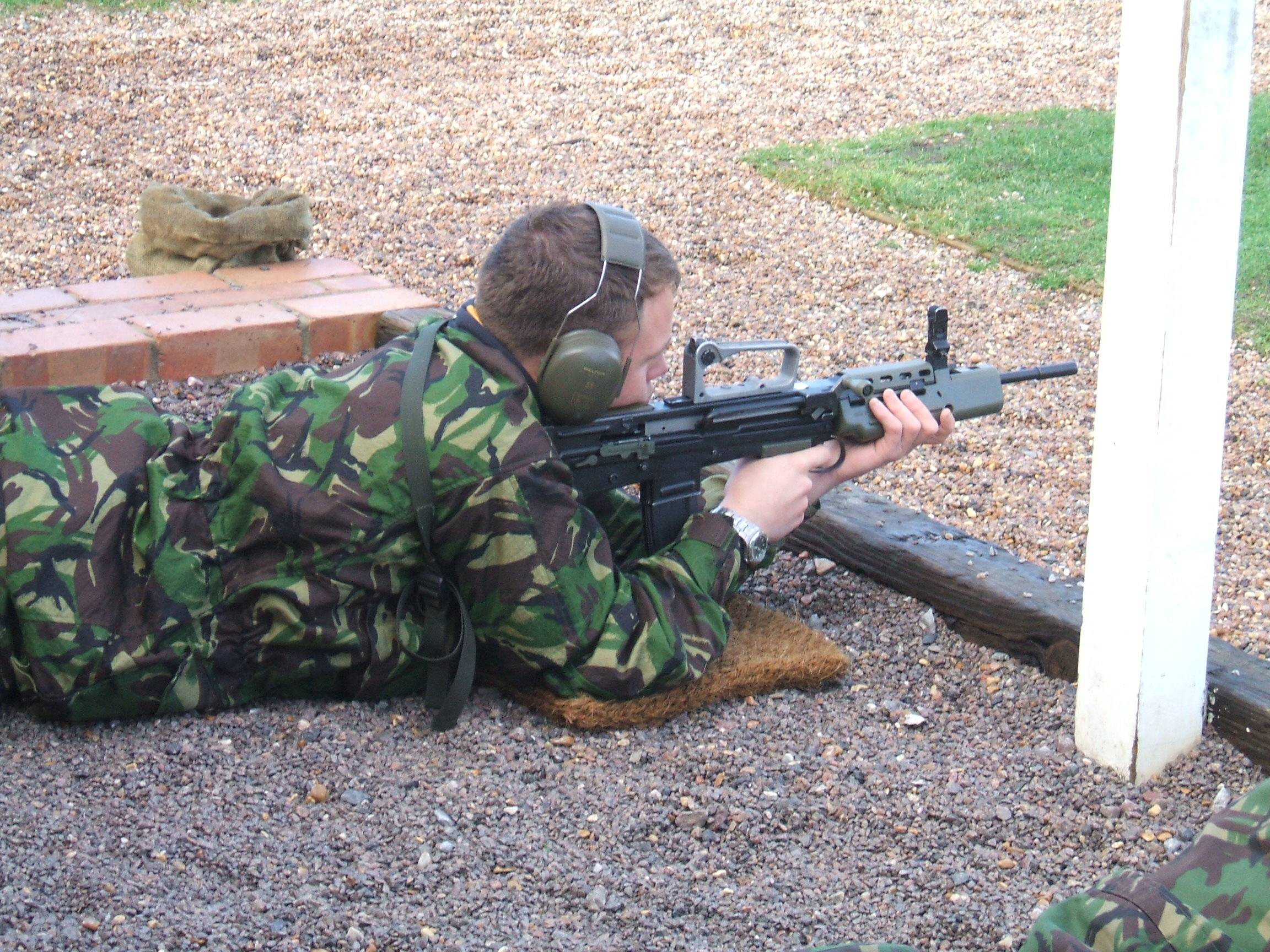
Sea Cadet firing the now-retired L98A1 Cadet GP Rifle

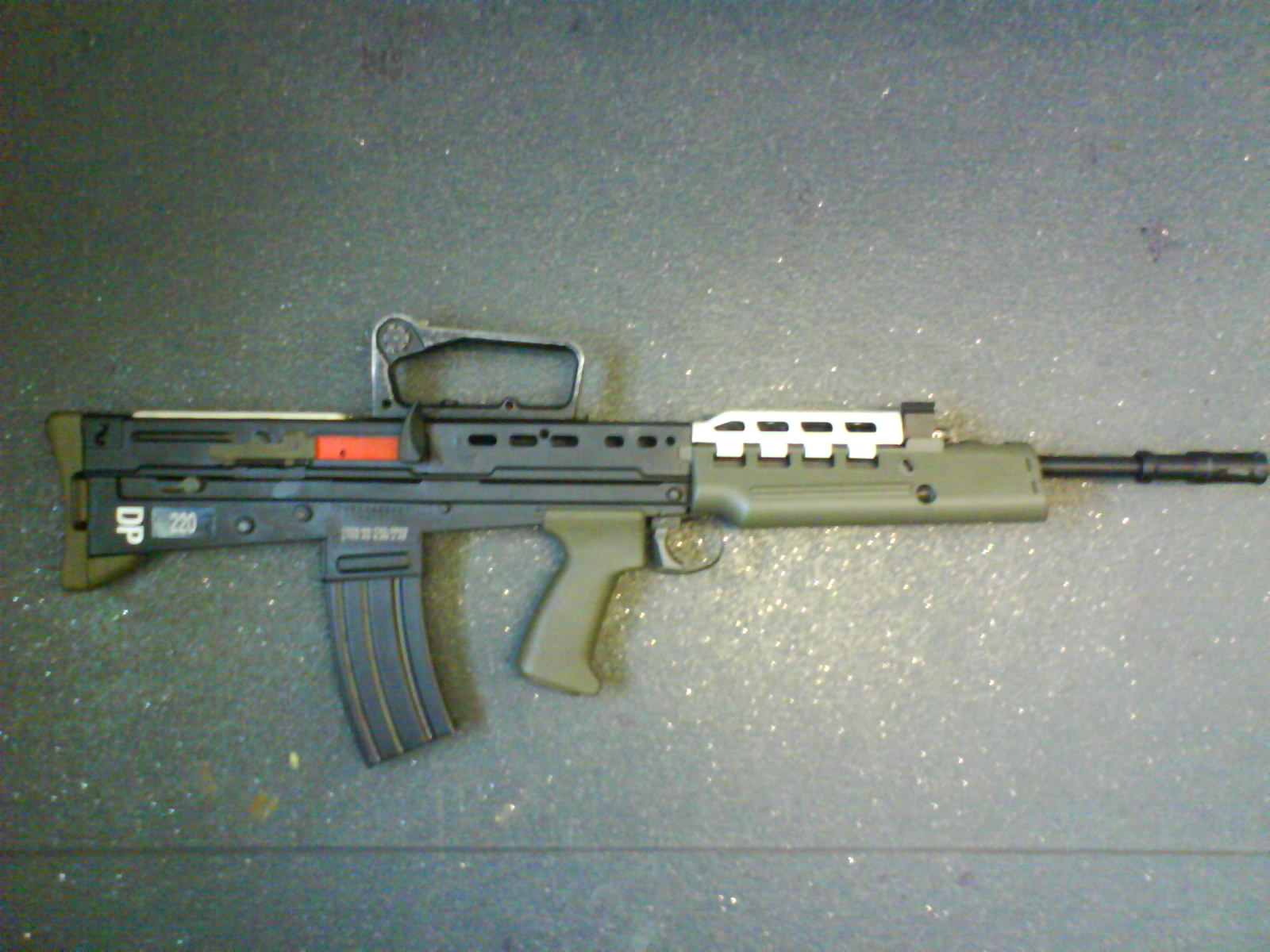
L103A2 Drill Purpose version of the L98A2 Cadet GP Rifle. This particular example lacks the front sight post.

The L98 Cadet General Purpose (GP) Rifle is used for weapons training by the Combined Cadet Force and Community Cadet Forces. The L98A2 is based on the L85A2 rifle but lacks fully automatic capability and is fitted with a plain foresight blade without a tritium insert.

The initial L98A1 version was introduced in 1987 to replace the .303 Lee–Enfield No. 4 rifles and .303 Bren guns in the Army Cadet Force. These weapons had not been replaced by the SLR because its weight and recoil were considered excessive for younger cadets. The GP Rifle did not suffer from these limitations, and its suitability for cadet use was emphasised in official documentation. It resembled the L85A1 but lacked the gas operating system, instead being a manually operated, single-shot weapon. A cocking handle extension was mounted on the right side of the weapon for this purpose. It was also distinguishable by the absence of a flash eliminator and the use of standard iron sights.

In 2018, a number of cadet weapons were stolen, with some later recovered following a theft in northern England. This led to a review of rules governing the use and storage of weapons by cadet forces.

In 2009, following the beginning of the H&K A2 Programme, cadet forces began phasing in the newest L98A2. An example of a change that was introduced with the programme is the addition of a semi-automatic only trigger mechanism.

=== L402A1 0.22 Small Bore Rifle ===
A .22 rimfire calibre rifle based on the L85A2 was developed by Heckler & Koch in 2021. The weapon uses simple blowback operation, with its mechanism and magazine based on those of the L41A1 "Kit Conversion".

=== EIW97 ===
An experimental testbed variant using electrically actuated ammunition and powered by two AA batteries was developed by the Royal Ordnance project team during the 1990s as a possible future replacement for the SA80. It used a simple capacitor discharge system contained within a CBRN/EMP-resistant section inside the receiver. A microprocessor transmitting RS-232 signals was used to programme the weapon with a selected burst length across three selector positions. This allowed a rate of fire of 300–400 rounds per minute, which was considered more controllable for soldiers, while also offering potential advantages such as keeping more rounds from the magazine on target, reducing stray bullets and lowering the likelihood of barrel overheating and cook-off.

== Conflicts ==
The SA80 has been used in all conflicts in which the British Armed Forces have been involved since its introduction in the early 1980s. Deployments include the following:

- The Troubles (Operation Banner)
- Gulf War (Operation Granby)
- Yugoslav Wars (Operation Grapple)
- Sierra Leone Civil War (Operation Palliser)
- War in Afghanistan (Operations Veritas, Jacana, Herrick, and Toral)
- Iraq War (Operation Telic)

== Users ==
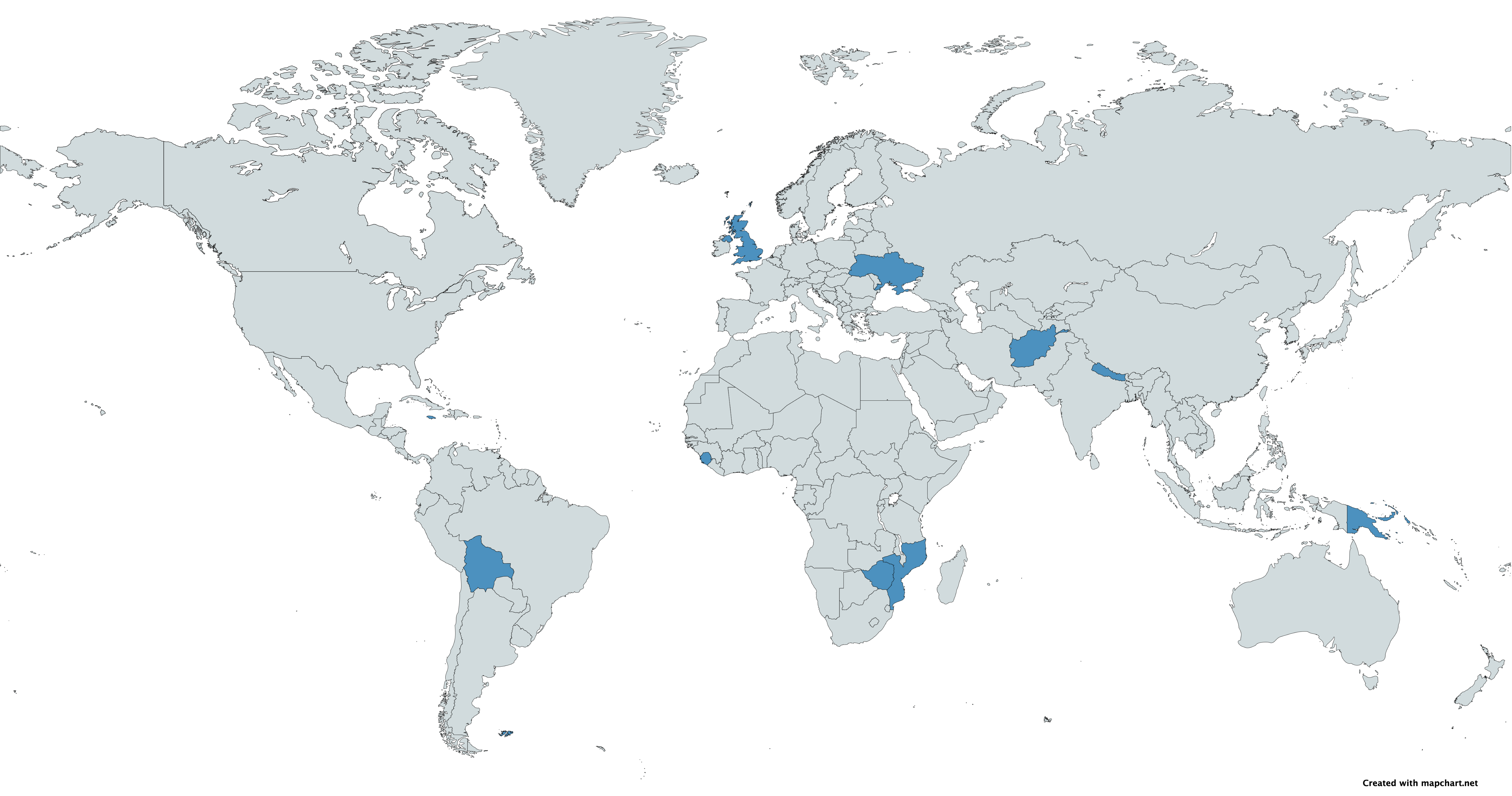
A map with SA80 users in blue

- Bolivia: Sold as part of British military aid; used by special military and police units.
- Jamaica: Used since 1992.
- Mozambique: Sold as part of British military aid.
- Nepal: Sold as part of British military aid.
- Papua New Guinea
- Sierra Leone: Sold as part of British military aid.
- United Kingdom: L85, L86, and L22 variants standard issue to the British Armed Forces. L98 and L86 variants standard issue to the Community Cadet Forces and Combined Cadet Force.
  - Bermuda (British Overseas Territory): 400 L85A2 rifles donated by the UK Ministry of Defence to the Royal Bermuda Regiment in August 2015; small stocks held before then for familiarisation purposes.
  - Falkland Islands (British Overseas Territory): Adopted by the Falkland Islands Defence Force in 2019 to replace the Steyr AUG
  - Gibraltar (British Overseas Territory): Standard issue to the Royal Gibraltar Regiment
- Ukraine: Used by Ukrainian forces in joint British and Ukraine training.
- Zimbabwe: Sold as part of British military aid.

=== Former users ===
- Islamic Republic of Afghanistan: Used by Afghan NDS and Commandos during the War in Afghanistan.
- British Hong Kong: Used by the Royal Hong Kong Regiment until 1995.

=== Non-state users ===
- Taliban: Some SA80s captured by the Taliban
- Ulster Defence Association, Ulster Volunteer Force, and other Northern Ireland-based Loyalist paramilitaries, stolen from British Army bases.
- West Side Boys of Sierra Leone: Weapons taken from the Royal Irish Regiment patrol captured on 25 August 2000

== See also ==
Other bullpup assault rifles

- FAMAS – (France)
- FN F2000 – (Belgium)
- Fusil Automático Doble – (Peru)
- HS Produkt VHS – (Croatia)
- IFAR 22 – (Indonesia)
- IWI Tavor – (Israel)
- Khaybar – (Iran)
- Malyuk – (Ukraine)
- QBZ-95 – (China)
- SAR 21 – (Singapore)
- Steyr AUG – (Austria)
