= Small Arms Weapons Effects Simulator =

The Small Arms Weapons Effect Simulator (SAWES) was a training device used by the British Army during the 1980s. It consisted of an infrared projector mounted on the L1A1 self-loading rifle and later the SA80, and a harness with receptors to receive the beams to simulate hits. The sight had a similar reticle as the SUSAT and a cable attached to the trigger that activated the device when using blank ammunition. An unusual 'Umpire gun' existed made from L1A1 components was used by range staff.

== Users ==
- United Kingdom

== See also ==
- Deployable Tactical Engagement System
- Multiple integrated laser engagement system
- Realistic Engagement And Combat Training System
- MilSim
- Airsoft
- Quasar
- Military exercise
- Paintball
- Opposing force
