= List of Source mods =

This is a selected list of Source engine mods (modifications), the game engine created by Valve for most of their games, including Half-Life, Team Fortress 2, and Portal, as well as licensed to third parties. This list is divided into single-player and multiplayer mods.

== Single-player mods ==
- Aperture Tag - A modification based on Portal 2 that recreates the essence of the game Tag: The Power of Paint, the inspiration for the various gels used in Portal 2. Instead of a portal gun, the player solves puzzles using a mix of these gels that they can spray onto surfaces with a tool they carry.
- Black Mesa - A third-party recreation of Half-Life (1998) that was made in response to the release of Half-Life: Source (2004), a port of the original game to the Source engine. Black Mesa originally released as a free mod in September 2012, and later had a full commercial release on Steam in March 2020.
- Coastline to Atmosphere - A mod set in the Half-Life 2 universe, following Gordon Freeman after the events of Half-Life 2.
- Dear Esther - An experimental "ghost story" created as a research project at the University of Portsmouth; initially released as a free modification in 2008, a longer commercial version was developed and released in 2012.
- Entropy: Zero - A Half-Life 2 modification developed by Breadman set before the base game's story in which a Combine Civil Protection officer, named "Bad Cop", becomes stranded in City 10.
- Entropy: Zero - Uprising - A mod of Entropy: Zero developed by Employee8 and Filipad that takes place during the uprising in Half-Life 2.
- Entropy: Zero 2 - A sequel to Entropy: Zero. Set post-Half-Life 2, its story follows Bad Cop, who has been promoted to "Elite" status, as he works to capture Dr. Judith Mossman, the former assistant of Earth's Administrator. Developed over the course of five years, Entropy: Zero 2 was released in August 2022 to positive reviews on Steam, and went on to win Mod DB's 2022 "Mod of the Year" award in the "Players Choice" category.
- Flipside - A side-scrolling platform game that allows the player to "flip" the game world around to its backside, altering the means a player can traverse a level.
- Half-Life 2: Overcharged - A single-player mod for Half-Life 2 that adds new enemies and locations as well as cut content, extending the base game. Originally released in 2022, the mod gained notoriety in 2024 due to the mod developers blacklisting content creators that criticized the mod by targeting their Steam IDs and crashing their game. This led to the mod being review bombed on Mod DB.
- Jurassic Life - A modification based on the first Jurassic Park film. The game acts as a side story to the movie where the player takes the role of the park's game warden, Robert Muldoon.
- Korsakovia - A single-player mod for Half-Life 2. It was developed by The Chinese Room and released September 19, 2009. In Korsakovia, the player travels through the delusions of Christopher, a man suffering from Korsakoff's Syndrome. The player hears the voices of Christopher and a doctor as they try to work out what is wrong with Christopher.
- Minerva - An episodic single-player mod based in the Half-Life 2 universe, using storytelling inspired by classic games such as Marathon and System Shock.
- Operation Black Mesa - An upcoming remake of the Half-Life expansion Opposing Force developed by Tripmine Studio.
- Portal: Prelude - An unofficial prequel to Portal, set before the activation of GLaDOS when scientists used to watch over the test chambers and instruct the test subjects.
- Portal Reloaded - A mod atop Portal 2 that introduces the ability to place a third portal that sends the player-characters or objects through between the present and a future state of the same test chamber. Actions in the present state will alter the future, though manipulation of the future situation will not impact the present, allowing, for example, for one to bring a weighted cube set in the present from its position in the future, back through the time portal, and use that version of the cube in the present.
- Portal: Revolution - A mod build on Portal 2 by Second Face Software, in which the player controls an anonymous test subject in the destroyed Aperture Science laboratories. The player is tasked to repair a teleportation device. The mod is set in between the events of Portal and Portal 2.
- Portal Stories: Mel - A mod build on Portal 2, in which the player controls Mel, a female test subject who is named after a character that Valve had originally designed for Portal 2's cooperative mode. It is a fan-made mod that takes place after the events of Portal and before the events of Portal 2.
- Prospekt - A fan-made sequel to Half-Life: Opposing Force that follows its protagonist, U.S. Marine Adrian Shepherd, as he is sent to help Gordon Freeman during the "Nova Prospekt" segment of Half-Life 2.
- Research and Development, a "non-combative" modification that has been likened to Portal, in which the player uses the gravity gun and other aspects of the Source engine physics to solve puzzles and progress forward.
- Rexaura, a Portal modification developed by Ben "Mevious" Bryant featuring 20 (from 00 to 19) puzzles designed around manipulating and ricocheting energy pellets.
- Riot Act - A mod set in the Half-Life 2 universe, following a member of the civilian resistance on their escape from the Combine prison at Nova Prospekt.

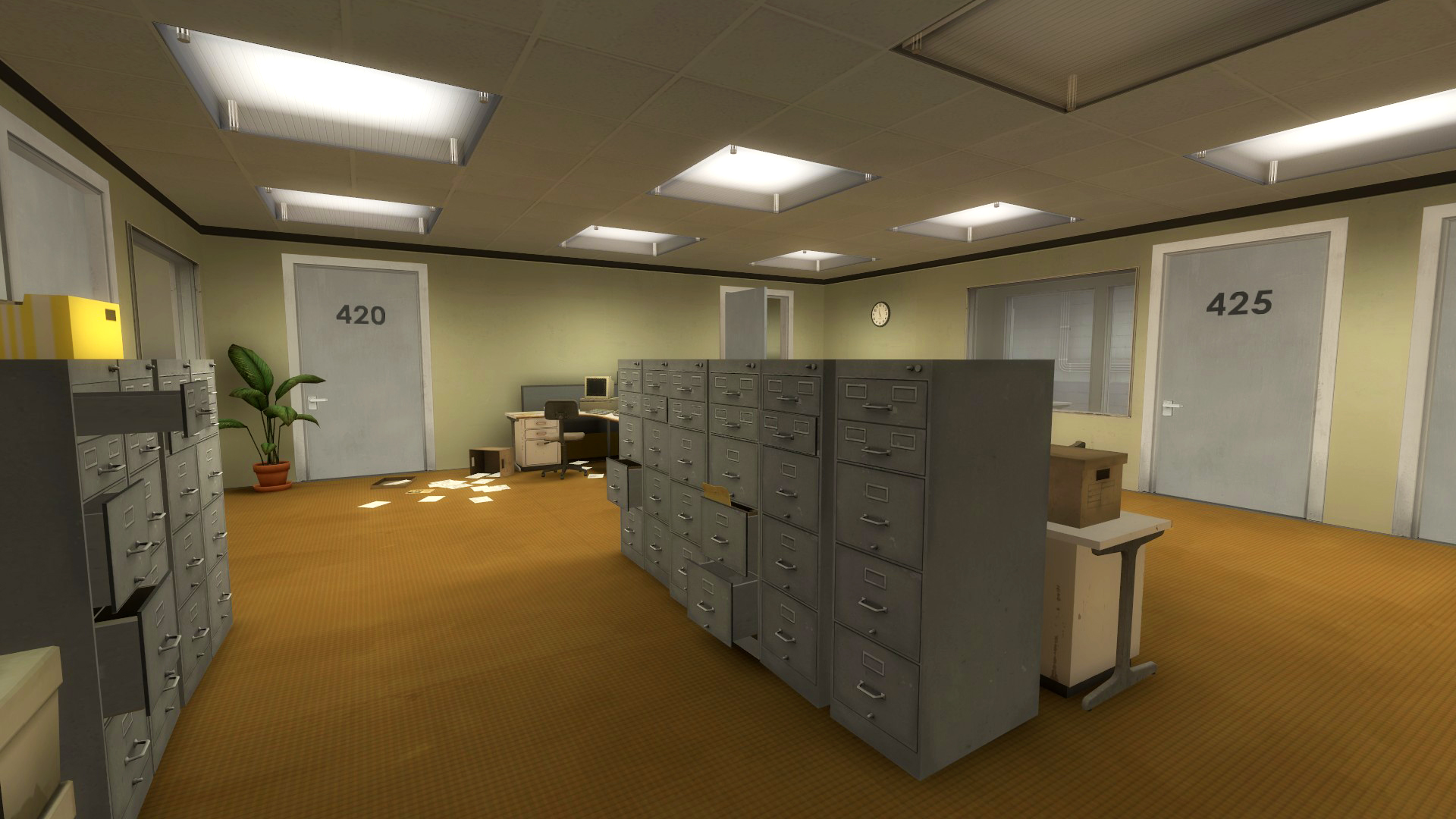
A screenshot from The Stanley Parable, taken from the full game

- The Stanley Parable - An interactive fiction modification, with multiple endings depending on decisions made by the player. Similar to Dear Esther, the mod was developed into a full commercial release in 2013.
- Thinking with Time Machine - A mod built atop Portal 2, which adds in the ability for the player to create a brief recording of their actions and then interact with that recording on its playback, including the use of portals.

== Multiplayer mods ==
- Age of Chivalry - A multiplayer modification. Players fight for either the Mason Order or Agathian Knights in a fictional medieval environment using swords, spears and many other medieval weapons. The mod was released on September 10, 2007. Age of Chivalry received Mod DB Editor's Choice for 2007.
- Counter-Strike: Malvinas - A multiplayer first-person shooter modification of Counter-Strike: Source, developed and distributed by Argentine web hosting company Dattatec. The game is set in Stanley, the capital of the Falkland Islands. The objective of the game is same to that of the Counter-Strike series; each round is won by either detonating a bomb or by eliminating all members of the enemy team. The mod prompted strong controversy in the United Kingdom; Dattatec's website was targeted by British hackers on March 27, 2013.
- Dino D-Day - The game is set in 1942 during World War II. The premise of the game is that Adolf Hitler has resurrected dinosaurs, and players can battle online choosing to serve either the Allied nations or the Nazis.
- Dystopia - A cyberpunk-themed total conversion, somewhat based on popular role-playing game Shadowrun, that pits Punk mercenaries against corporate security forces in both the physical world and cyberspace. Last release August 23, 2014. Dystopia received the Player's Choice Honorable Mention from Mod DB in 2006, Best Mod for Half-Life 2 during the Independent Games Festival in 2006, and received the "Mod Of The Year - 3rd place" and "Genre Award - Action" for mods of 2005 by Mod DB.
- Empires - A first-person shooter/real-time strategy hybrid where each team led by a commander, viewing the world in the top-down perspective leading troops in the first-person perspective. It features a variety of player classes and vehicles. Empires has received media coverage from IGF, PC Games magazine, PC Action magazine, SteamFriends, and Planet Half-Life. It was also awarded the "Genre Award: Multi-Genre" from Mod DB in 2006, won 3rd place Player's Choice at Mod DB's MOTY awards 2007, and received a Silver award from SteamFriends as 2nd best Source mod of 2007.
- Eternal Silence - A hard science fiction, class-based first-person shooter featuring infantry and space combat scenarios. Eternal Silence pits two capital ships of rival factions against one another for domination of human-occupied space. It won "Best Mod - Multiplayer FPS" during the Independent Games Festival in 2006, "Best Multiplayer Mod of the Year - Honorable Mention" from Mod DB in 2006, and "Mod DB Editors' Choice Award" in 2007.
- Firearms: Source - A successor to Firearms, a GoldSrc team deathmatch mod. It was created by a different development team and was released on July 23, 2010. The initial release included eight maps, five game modes, and 31 weapons. Giochi per il mio computer gave the mod a rating of two out of five.
- Fortress Forever - A mod based on Valve's Team Fortress Classic, but has been created entirely from scratch by the Fortress Forever development team. The intended scope of Fortress Forever is to please the adamant Team Fortress Classic fans, while at the same time creating a game enjoyable enough to players new to Team Fortress styled games. The mod was released on September 13, 2007. Fortress Forever received "Best mod of 2007" in PC Gamer magazine.
- Fistful of Frags - A first-person shooter set in the Wild West. Released as a mod in 2007 and as a standalone game in 2014.
- Garry's Mod - A "sandbox" mod that allows the player to manipulate objects using the Source physics engine. Allows both single and multi-player interaction. Version 13 released commercially and version 9 is still available on Steam. Garry's Mod received Mod DB's "Player's Choice Honorable Mention" from Mod DB in 2006, "Mod of the Year" in 2005 and "Genre Award: Puzzle" in 2005.
- GoldenEye: Source - A total conversion for Half-Life 2 that aims to recreate the original Nintendo 64 classic GoldenEye 007. It received Mod DB's "Editors' Choice for Reinvention" in 2006, "Third Place, Mod of the Year" in 2006, and "Fourth Place, Top Unreleased Mods" in 2005.
- Half-Life 2: Capture the Flag - A simple capture-the-flag mod. Players are divided into two teams, Combine and Rebels, and try to steal the other team's flag from their base and return it to their own for points, with the aid of ability enhancing runes and various weapons.
- The Hidden - Puts one player (called The Hidden) as an invisible genetically modified human against a team of SWAT-like operatives called the Infinitum Research Intercept Squad, (IRIS) with regular human attributes but a selection of weapons to choose. The IRIS team's objective is to hunt down the Hidden, while the Hidden attempts to stalk and kill the IRIS team without being detected. Hidden: Source won Mod DB's "Fourth Place, Mod of the Year" in 2006, "Editors' Choice for Ambience" in 2006, and "Editors' Choice for Multiplayer" in 2005.
- Insurgency: Modern Infantry Combat - Is a total conversion mod for Valve's Source engine. Insurgency is a multiplayer, tactical first person shooter, and implements elements of realism, in an attempt to increase player immersion and promote teamwork. The game is primarily set in the Iraq war, however some maps are set in Afghanistan, and future updates are planned to expand the setting into a hypothetical conflict in Kosovo and other theatres. Insurgency received the Player's Choice 2007 "Mod of the Year" award from ModDB, as well as the "Best Source Mod of 2007" Gold Award from Steamfriends.
- Iron Grip: The Oppression - A first-person shooter/real-time strategy hybrid set within the fictional Iron Grip universe in a predominantly urban setting. The game pits two separate factions against each other: the Rahmos and the Resistance. Playing as the Rahmos gives at least one player control of an array of AI-controlled NPCs in a top-down real-time strategy perspective. Players in the resistance, conversely, are individual players in the first-person perspective fighting the player-controlled NPCs. Awarded Editors' Choice for Innovation from Mod DB in 2006, and Players' Choice Honorable Mention for Multi-Genre from Mod DB in 2006.
- Jailbreak Source - A team based first-person shooter where each team has a jail in their base. When an enemy player is killed, they will respawn inside your jail, where they can either await release by their own team who are fighting to get to the release button, or escape by their own means, through devious and deadly escape routes. Jailbreak Source has received media coverage and reviews from Planet Half-Life, Total PC Gaming magazine, and Mod DB. Alongside Interviews with Mod DB and Interlopers.net
- NeoTokyo is a Half-Life 2 mod which puts the player into a future Tokyo universe inspired by anime such as Akira and Ghost in the Shell developed by Studio Radi-8.
- No More Room in Hell is a total conversion inspired by the films of George A. Romero. This survival horror game features eight-player co-op and hordes of NPC zombies.
- Nuclear Dawn is a mix of first-person shooter and real-time strategy set in a dystopian post-apocalyptic future. Each team has one commander who build support structures in top-down perspective mode, other players take role of the field units in a first-person perspective.
- Pirates, Vikings and Knights II - A mostly melee-based mod featuring three factions – Pirates, Vikings and Knights – and includes map objectives such as Team Deathmatch or Last Team Standing.
- Science and Industry 2 - It was released on July 3, 2008 as a sequel to the GoldSrc mod. The gameplay is similar to the previous mod where the main objective is to capture enemy NPC scientists while defending your own.
- Synergy - A cooperative mod. Synergy supports official campaigns by Valve, user-made levels, and other third-party mods (MINERVA, City 7, and Riot Act). In September 2008, Valve introduced it as one of the first five Source mods being offered on Steam and supported by Steamworks.
- Team Fortress 2 Classified - A Team Fortress 2 mod that reimagines the game using its 2008-2009 incarnation as a base, adding new weapons, maps, and game modes.
- Zombie Panic! Source - A team-based zombie themed mod which pits player-controlled survivors against player-controlled zombies. The gameplay style simulates an outbreak: The zombie team starts with only a few players, but their ranks grow as survivors are defeated and switch to the zombie team. Its first public release was on December 28, 2007, and it received the Mod DB, players' choice, top unreleased mod award for 2007.

== See also ==
- Half-Life 2 § Mods
- List of GoldSrc engine mods
- List of video games derived from mods
