= Emesis Blue =

2023 Team Fortress 2 fan-film

- Directed by: Chad Payne
- Written by: Chad Payne
- Based on: Team Fortress 2 by Valve Software
- Produced by: Anton Pelizzari
- Production company: Fortress Films
- Distributed by: Fortress Films (Through YouTube)
- Release date: February 20, 2023
- Running time: 108 minutes
- Country: Australia
- Language: English

Emesis Blue is a 2023 Australian adult animated independent psychological horror fan film directed by Chad Payne, based on the multiplayer first-person shooter game Team Fortress 2, and a sequel to the 2018 short film Spy's Disguise. The film was produced entirely in Source Filmmaker, by the fan group Fortress Films, and released for free on YouTube on February 20, 2023. Emesis Blue bases many of its assets directly on those of the original game, following the nine playable mercenary characters on a fictionalized depiction of the 2Fort multiplayer map, but maintains a mature, surreal tone with a largely original narrative. At a total of one hour and 48 minutes, it received critical acclaim for its high production value and length, both of which were said to be closer to those of a feature film than a typical Source Filmmaker production.

Drawing on the backstory originally presented in Team Fortress 2, the film is set on Halloween of 1968 during the fictional Gravel Wars between mercenaries hired by the companies of Builders League United (BLU) and Reliable Excavation Demolition (RED). The film follows a largely original plotline to its inspiration, rewriting elements of the story to present a more serious and grounded tone, but includes diegetic references to game mechanics like rocket jumping, the capture the flag game mode, and respawning, with a large part of the film's story focusing on a non-canonical "respawn machine" supposedly used in-universe to revive the mercenaries during fighting.

== Plot ==
In 1968 on Halloween night, Jeremy, a former BLU Scout, visits his Medic colleague Dr. Fritz Ludwig due to the side effects of an accident involving the "Respawn Machine", a device that can resurrect users; he complains of paranoia, nightmares, and the injuries that got him fired from the company. Jeremy returns home to his single mother, watching a copy of M he stole from Ludwig's office. He receives a telephone call playing back his previous conversation with Ludwig, before turning to see his mother's severed head peering around a wall and a masked figure standing in the corner of the room. Meanwhile, Detective Jacques Murnau, a former BLU Spy, investigates the disappearance of Jules Archibald, the BLU chairman and Governor of New Mexico. Murnau and his Soldier assistant tail a former BLU Heavy who the Soldier nicknames Stalingrad as he waits to hand off a briefcase. Soldier kills Stalingrad in an altercation, but a figure resembling a plague doctor attacks Murnau and escapes with the briefcase in a hearse.

Ludwig sees himself inside Jeremy's house, witnessing Jeremy's deceased mother, before awakening in his office with blood covering his hands. He receives photographs of Jeremy being stalked and a phone call playing their earlier conversation and Jeremy's muffled voice. Ludwig is directed by a bloody inscription in his office to Conagher Slaughterhouse, a RED base. At the slaughterhouse, he narrowly avoids a resurrected Stalingrad while escaping to the basement. He frees Jeremy, who believes Ludwig to be his captor, only for him to be recaptured and tortured to death by brothers Zed and Maynard Conagher, the slaughterhouse's owners. Maynard kills Ludwig after a fist fight, only for Ludwig to mysteriously resurrect and kill the brothers before finding the stolen briefcase.

Murnau and Soldier pose as federal agents and search Jeremy's house, finding Ludwig's bonesaw at the murder scene. At Ludwig's office, they receive a call playing Fritz's voice and find the bloody inscription. Arriving at the slaughterhouse, they outwit and fatally wound a RED Sniper in the sewers, but Murnau is captured by the masked figure from Jeremy's house, a Pyro. Soldier experiences a temporal anomaly in the base's lobby before freeing "Cyclops", a wounded RED Demoman, who informs Soldier that the base is no longer under RED's control. The two reach a weapons locker in the resupply room as they are attacked by a mutated Scout and undead RED mercenaries. Ludwig, suffering a psychotic break, defeats an undead RED Medic and goes upstairs, where he helps Soldier and Cyclops evade Stalingrad. Murnau escapes captivity and shoots the Pyro, but is burned in a resulting gasoline fire.

All four mercenaries begin to lose their grasp on reality as they move deeper into the slaughterhouse. Soldier and Cyclops find Archibald locked inside a cage, but Soldier is separated from them. Cyclops, seemingly in purgatory, meets a third Conagher brother, Dell, who describes the Limbo-like eternity that mercenaries experience between respawns. Soldier finds Cyclops frozen to death in a cryogenics lab housing numerous clones of himself, before he and Ludwig defeat the resurrected Sniper and Pyro. Murnau kills Archibald after overhearing him confess to war profiteering with the respawn machines, then forces Ludwig and Soldier to play Russian roulette, killing Ludwig and allowing Soldier to leave. Pursued by Stalingrad, Soldier finally escapes the slaughterhouse as it burns down, crushing Stalingrad as it collapses.

Soldier is interviewed by Agent Stemmons, a CIA agent, who instructs him to stay quiet about the events that unfolded. At Archibald's funeral, attended by the rival brothers Blutarch and Redmond Mann, CEOs of BLU and RED, Murnau gives a cover story of Ludwig murdering Archibald and committing suicide, installing himself as Archibald's successor. A resurrected Ludwig suddenly rises from Archibald's supposed coffin and shoots Murnau, battling his way out. Soldier defects and hands Ludwig the briefcase, helping fight off the Mann brothers' bodyguards and BLU mercenaries. Soldier kills a wounded Blutarch while Ludwig escapes the police in an ambulance, running over Redmond in the chaos, only to die in a car crash outside the city and gave slight view of what inside the briefcase which glowing in red. He meets Archibald, Jeremy, and Dell in purgatory before emerging from the flaming Respawn Machine in the burning Conagher Slaughterhouse.

== Cast ==
- "JazzyJoeyJr" as the Soldier
- David Love as Jules Archibald and Blutarch Mann
- Cameron Nichols as the Scout
- John Whinfield as background voices
- Anton Pelizzari as Zed & Dell Conagher and background voices
- Chad Payne as Dr. Fritz Ludwig, the Detective, Cyclops, Maynard Conagher, Redmond Mann, the Hunter, Agent Stemmons, and Stalingrad

An honorable thanks was given to late voice actor Rick May, whose legacy voice acting in the original game was occasionally used for the Soldier's screams and laughs.

== Production and style ==
Emesis Blue was developed over the course of four years in Source Filmmaker, led by Australian writer and director Chad Payne. The film combines 3D Source animation with strong, neo-noir lighting, focusing on authenticity to the original game's assets and acknowledging the technical limitations of the software. Sharp red-and-blue lights are used over otherwise desaturated sets to emulate in-game team differentiation, while policemen and other background characters not readily available in the original assets are shaded out as silhouettes to distinguish them from the canonical cast of Team Fortress 2 models.

A second Team Fortress film by the creators is "all but confirmed" under development as of 2024, currently titled Murder Inc.

== Reception ==
Emesis Blue has been lauded as the first mainstream feature film to have been produced with Source Filmmaker, and the first Source project of its kind since Darkest Days, an earlier hour-long musical fan-film based on Left 4 Dead 2. Praise was directed towards the film's tone, visuals, voice cast, and technical ambition, while its narrative was described as reliant on mystery, nonlinear storytelling, and audience engagement through fan theories. Some background details of the film's universe were noted as overly reliant on familiarity with the original game's story, but the experience was otherwise described as appealing to general horror fans as well.

Film journalist Kayvon Bumpus noted some remaining budgetary constraints placed on the film, but nonetheless considered Emesis Blue a potential "crowning achievement" for both machinima and Source Filmmaker, writing that "countless projects with more budget, staff, and polish have failed to impress like this animated indie gem does". Gaming critic Yahtzee Croshaw praised the film as an engaging noir narrative and an example of what he coined as post-punk, arguing its production and tone subverted mainstream filmmaking standards by instead relying on the punk art practices of earlier satirical works like Heavy is Dead.

== See also ==
- M (1931)
- The Jaunt
- Saxxy Awards
