= Rick May =

Canadian-American actor (1940–2020)

- May in 2017
- Born: Richard James May; September 21, 1940; Bassano, Alberta, Canada
- Died: April 5, 2020 (aged 79); Seattle, Washington, U.S.
- Education: St. Olaf College
- Occupations: Actor; voice actor; theatrical performer; director; teacher
- Years active: 1957–2020

Richard James May (September 21, 1940 – April 5, 2020) was a Canadian-American actor, theatrical performer, director, and teacher. May provided the English-language voice for Peppy Hare and Andross in Star Fox 64, the Soldier in Team Fortress 2, and Dr. M in Sly 3: Honor Among Thieves, among other video game characters. He also played Inspector Lestrade in the long running radio show The Further Adventures of Sherlock Holmes from 1998 through 2020.

== Early life ==
May was born on September 21, 1940. He was raised in Washington and Canada. May attended Roosevelt High School in Seattle and St. Olaf College (class of 1962) in Northfield, Minnesota. It was at Roosevelt High School in 1957 that he began his acting career, performing at a Meet-The-Teacher event at the school. He became a naturalized U.S. citizen in 1960.

== Career ==
May served in the U.S. military and was stationed in Japan, where he coordinated USO shows in Tokyo. May returned to the Seattle area to serve as the director of the Renton Civic Theatre and Civic Light Opera in Renton, Washington. In one production of the Cotton Patch Gospel in Renton, May played all 21 roles with a variety of voices. He retired from the Renton Civic Theatre in 2002 to begin his own theater company in Kirkland, Washington, and become a full-time actor.

May began voice acting in video games in the late 1990s, including roles as Peppy Hare and Andross in Star Fox 64; various campaign characters, including Genghis Khan in Age of Empires II and the Soldier in Team Fortress 2.

From 1998 through 2020, May played Inspector Lestrade in the Imagination Theatre radio series The Further Adventures of Sherlock Holmes. He also played Lestrade in the related radio series The Classic Adventures of Sherlock Holmes, and played various roles in other Imagination Theatre radio dramas. The last two episodes of The Further Adventures of Sherlock Holmes to feature May were recorded in late 2019, and were first broadcast in May 2020. May played the role of Inspector Lestrade longer than any other actor in the history of broadcasting.

== Death and tributes ==
May suffered a stroke in February 2020, and was moved to a nursing home for rehabilitation. He died from COVID-19 complications at Swedish Medical Center in Seattle on April 5, 2020. He was inurned in the columbarium at Tahoma National Cemetery in Kent on June 12, 2020.

On May 1, 2020, Valve released an update to Team Fortress 2 adding a tribute to May's voice work as the Soldier in the form of a new main menu theme titled "Saluting The Fallen", a rendition of "Taps", and locking the character image in the main menu to Soldier. The update also added statues of the Soldier saluting to most of the official in-game maps. These statues all featured a commemorative plaque dedicated to May, and remained in maps until June 1. The statues reappear annually, between 12 and 14 April, on the anniversary of May's death. The statues emit a number of pre-selected voice lines from the Soldier when approached. On August 21, 2020, a permanent tribute memorial was placed, in the form of a Soldier statue and heads on the fence on the map "Granary", which is the setting of the Team Fortress 2 video "Meet the Soldier".

Many players in the community paid tribute to May's death in-game, where taunts and voice lines were played commemorating him. On most servers, a truce was called for both sides to pay tribute to the actor, and 21-gun salutes were fired on the map 2Fort. Additionally, numerous animated shorts in Source Filmmaker were created and uploaded by the Team Fortress 2 community in honor of May. On December 20, 2024, Valve released the final Team Fortress 2 comic dedicated to May.

== Filmography ==
=== Film ===
| Year | Title | Role |
|---|---|---|
| 1973 | American Graffiti | Boy in the car |
| 1982 | Frances | Policeman |
| 1988 | The Chocolate War | Doctor |
| 1990 | Child in the Night | Captain Hook |

=== Video games ===
His voice-overs include:

| Year | Title | Role |
|---|---|---|
| 1997 | Star Fox 64 | Peppy Hare, Andross |
| 1999 | Age of Empires II | Genghis Khan, others |
| 2001 | Freddi Fish 5: The Case of the Creature of Coral Cove | Marty Sardini, Dadfish |
| 2005 | Sly 3: Honor Among Thieves | Dr. M |
| 2007 | Team Fortress 2 | The Soldier |

== Theater ==
May performed in numerous roles throughout his theatrical career, including:

- Brutus (in Julius Caesar)
- Benjamin Franklin (in 1776)
- Tevye (in Fiddler on the Roof)
- Rick Mayfly in a children's play at the Vermont DNR office in Montpelier
- Willy Loman (in Death of a Salesman)
- Alfred Doolittle (in Pygmalion)
- Theodore Roosevelt (in Bully!)
- Richard Huckle (in The Pillow Man)
- King Henry II (in The Lion in Winter)
- Inspector Lestrade (on radio in The Further Adventures of Sherlock Holmes)
