= Jaunt =

Jaunt may refer to:

- Teleportation, called jaunting in
  - Alfred Bester's The Stars My Destination (the origin of the term "to jaunte")
  - The Jaunt, a Stephen King story
  - The Tomorrow People, television series

== See also ==
- Jaunting car
