= Firearm (disambiguation) =

A firearm is a projectile weapon.

Firearm or fire arm may also refer to:

- Firearm (comics), a comic book series printed by Malibu Comics
- Firearm (Marvel Comics), a character in the Marvel Comics universe
- Firearms (video game), a first-person shooter
- Firearm, a character in the Lego Agents toy series
- "Firearm", a song by Lizzy McAlpine from her 2022 album, Five Seconds Flat
