= 2Fort =

Video game map in the Team Fortress series

- Team Fortress 2 location
- 2Fort in Team Fortress 2, as seen on the outside, looking towards the RED Team's base.
- First appearance: Quake Team Fortress (1996)
- Created by: Valve
- Genre: First-person shooter

In-universe information
- Location: Teufort, New Mexico, U.S.

2Fort (filename ctf_2fort), also known as the fictional town of Teufort in the comics, is a multiplayer map playable in the first-person shooter games Quake Team Fortress, Team Fortress Classic, Team Fortress 2, and in the multiplayer mods Fortress Forever and Team Fortress 2 Classified. Consisting of two similar buildings separated by a short bridge and a moat, each team must fight their way into the opposing team's building and capture the flag, a briefcase of papers called the Intelligence, from an underground base concealed beneath. Released as a launch map for Team Fortress 2, 2Fort was critically acclaimed as an iconic map for the series, and one of the best first-person shooter maps of all time.

== Level design ==
2Fort is a symmetrical map, with each team's intelligence located in an underground fortress beneath the two buildings, identical in layout but differing cosmetically. The design allows players to "come together and battle it out along the center bridge". The map is designed so that each class can take a different tactical approach, such as Heavies and Medics fighting along the bridge while Spies and Engineers can attempt to sneak through the sewers. The layout of the map remained largely untouched between Team Fortress and its sequel.

== Development ==
According to Charlie Brown, the project lead of Team Fortress 2, the development team found it "tough to settle on a plausible environmental excuse" for having both teams in such close proximity to each other on maps like 2Fort. While initially considering space, they found "space marines" to be an overused trope. They decided to make the game have an "iconic" setting based on "'60s spy-meets-sci-fi movies", so that "sense-making isn't necessary". The map was designed to look deceptive, with "neither teams' façades [being] nearly as high-tech as what's underneath". Hints of high-tech elements were disguised within the map, such as secret video cameras, or making cows actually be wooden billboards. Overall, the interior of each team's base in 2Fort was designed to look like "a command center or NORAD-style space".

In 2009, the source files of the 2Fort map, among other maps, were released by Valve to allow for easier modding. For the 2015 Invasion Update, the community-created "2Fort Invasion" map was added to the game, remodeling the map to look like it was being invaded by aliens.

== Reception and legacy ==
Alex Walker of Kotaku called 2Fort one of the best first-person shooter multiplayer maps of all time, calling it an "absolute classic", and citing its design which allows every class to "contribute in some meaningful way". Shacknews called the map memorable due to the numerous servers hosting unending 2Fort games, which "became TF2's greatest charm", allowing teams to socialize with each other, and giving people "a magical place to unwind and just relax", a casual place to practice with the team's classes rather than worrying about capturing the intelligence.

PCGamesN called 2Fort a "fan favorite" map that "was awful if you wanted rounds that lasted under an hour", its design elements contributing to stalemates that made it a good place to socialize, and criticizing Overwatch for a lack of "low energy" social spaces by comparison. Nick Breckon of Shacknews agreed that the map's design resulted in "long, drawn-out stalemates", due to the location of the intelligence point beneath the enemy's spawn room. Robo Panda Z of Destructoid said that "nothing epitomizes the multiplayer experience for me more than this map", calling 2Fort a "capture the flag grind-fest" and an "eternal stalemate broken by the closest of teamwork", while praising the addition of a roof to the bridge in the Team Fortress 2 version. He stated that while "there are maps in TFC and TF2 I like considerably better than 2Fort [...] it is the absolute essence of a Capture the flag map, as well as a perfect example of how to improve on a design."

Steve Hogarty of PC Zone commented on how familiar 2Fort was to players of Team Fortress Classic upon the release of Team Fortress 2, saying that "even if you'd already been told it was a remade version of the popular Team Fortress Classic map [...] its layout already exists as a semi-familiar strategy map in the back of your mind". He noted that "strategically, it remains almost completely unchanged", and that there was "an eerie sense of déjà vu" for "fans of the original game".
