= Robin Walker (game designer) =

Australian video game designer

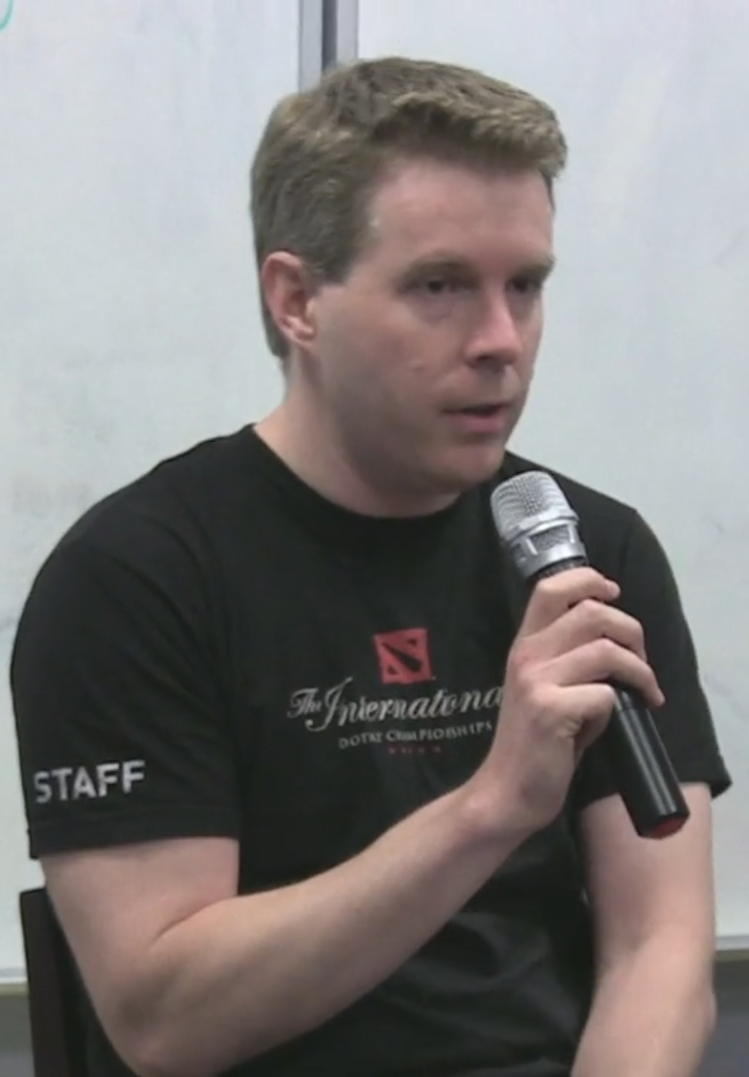
- Walker in 2013
- Born: 1975 or 1976 (age 49–50)
- Occupation: Video game designer

Robin Walker (born 1975 or 1976) is an Australian video game designer best known for co-developing the Quake Team Fortress mod, Team Fortress Classic, Team Fortress 2, and Half-Life: Alyx.

== Career ==
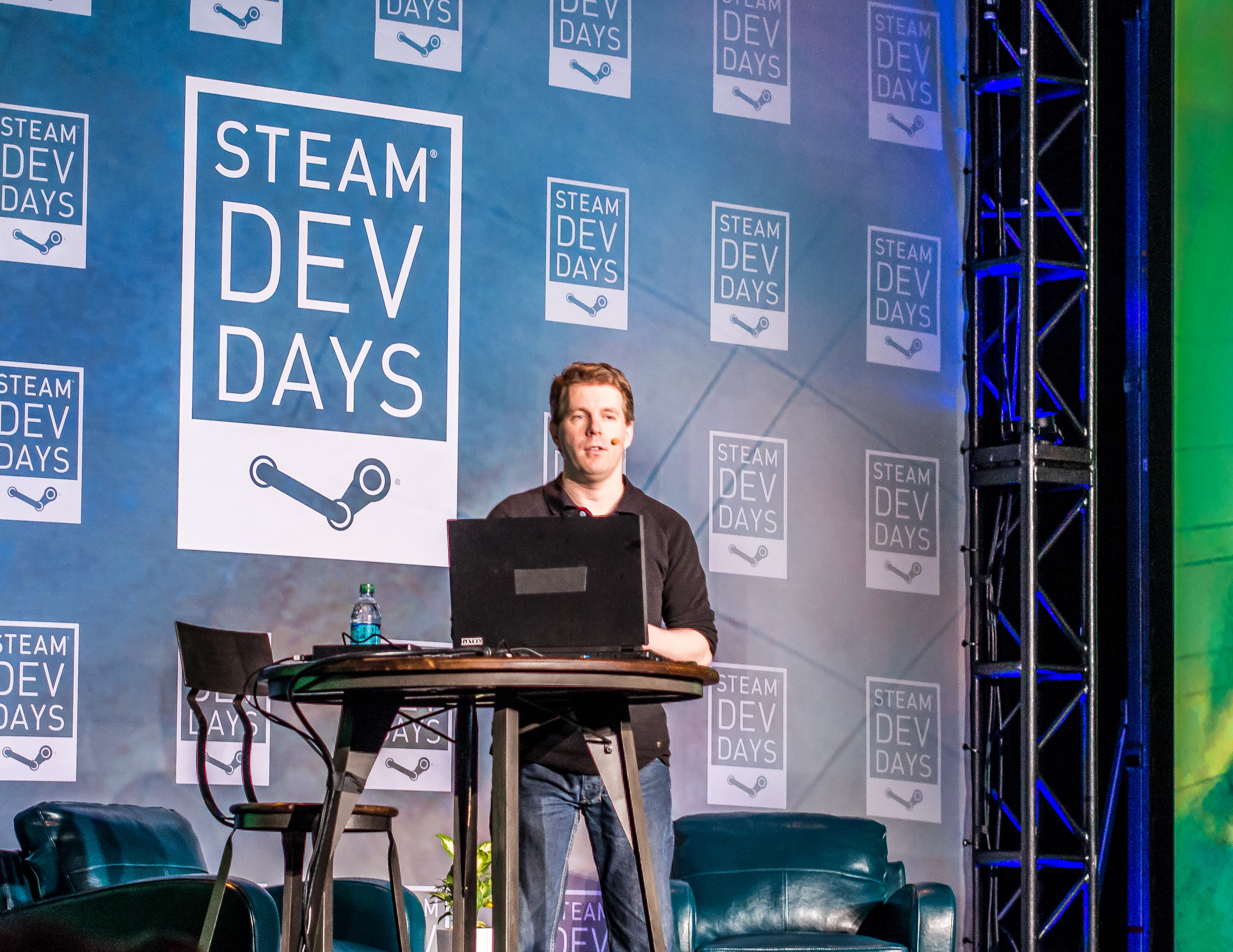
Walker at Steam Dev Days 2014

Walker attended RMIT University in Melbourne, Australia.

Together with John Cook and Ian Caughley, Walker started working on Team Fortress as a mod for id Software's QuakeWorld in 1996. Due to the popularity of the product, the team was hired by Valve to work on Team Fortress Classic and later on Team Fortress 2.

Walker has played development roles in various Valve games, including Half-Life 2 and Dota 2. More recently, Walker has been focused on the collision of economics and game design, in an attempt to transform Team Fortress 2 into a free-to-play, microtransaction-based game. Walker worked on Valve's flagship virtual reality game, Half-Life: Alyx, released on 23 March 2020.

== Influences and philosophy ==
Walker used Team Fortress 2 updates to research what additional features are and aren't popular. The results of which he has used for the development of Dota 2, as well as for later Team Fortress 2 updates. Walker also stated that he cannot guarantee that he would keep working on Team Fortress 2 indefinitely and that at some point, he will move on to a new project.

Walker believes in the importance of communication between players and developers of modern PC games, stating that "being close to your customers – being able to talk directly to your customers – is valuable." In his experience, successful multiplayer games "innovate in gameplay both on release, but also over time post-release, and that those innovations are significant and of interest to customers."

Walker is not worried about video game piracy, stating that to fight piracy, he is "looking at the things that pirates are providing and asking [himself] how [he] can provide something better than that." By releasing frequent updates of his games after launch, he constantly improves on his games in a way that pirates could not keep up with. Walker is a supporter of the free-to-play model, as he says that the model supports a wider variety of customers, including those with "very little money," and that such a variety of players results in greater opportunities for richer experiences.

== Selected credits ==
Year	Game title
1996	Team Fortress (Quake modification)
1998	Half-Life
1999	Team Fortress Classic
2000	Counter-Strike
2000	Gunman Chronicles
2004	Half-Life 2
2005	Half-Life 2: Lost Coast
2006	Half-Life 2: Episode One
2007	Half-Life 2: Episode Two
2007	Portal
2007	Team Fortress 2
2008	Left 4 Dead
2009	Left 4 Dead 2
2011	Portal 2
2013	Dota 2
2020	Half-Life: Alyx
