= Firearms (video game) =

FireArms
- Developer(s): FireArms Development Team
- Engine: Quake engine, GoldSrc
- Platform(s): Windows, Linux
- Release: 1998 (Quake mod); April 30, 2000 (Half-Life mod)
- Genre(s): First-person shooter
- Mode(s): Multiplayer

Firearms is a first-person shooter mod for Half-Life which originated from a Quake modification. Initially developed in 1998, Firearms was created as a quasi-realistic team-based FPS. The mod's main feature is the large amount of usable weapons in the game.

== Gameplay ==
In Firearms, players are divided into red and blue teams and are tasked with completing objectives. Objectives can vary from controlling areas to destroying objects. The main objective in all maps is to reduce the number of the opponent team's reinforcements to zero. Reinforcements determine the number of times players on a team can respawn. A team loses reinforcements when killed players respawn. The loss of reinforcements on a team can be stifled by completing map objectives and the direct and indirect actions of medics on the team. As long as a team has more than 0 reinforcements, players can respawn instantly. Firearms was the first FPS game to feature player-deployed parachutes.

Unlike other games, players are free to choose what weapons they want to use. There are no classes (although players can choose predefined and editable weapon configurations) or a money system used to buy weapons. Instead, Firearms uses a credit system where every player can spend 30 credits on weapons. Every player receives a free knife regardless of the weapons configuration they choose. Players can spend their credits on weapons and equipment, ammunition is free and can be obtained from ammunition boxes available throughout most maps for when a player runs out.

Players can buy skills by spending skill points. Every player starts out with 1 skill point and can earn another skill point for every 10 points they have. No more than 7 skill points can be obtained this way. The skill points can be used to buy skills which help the player. There are seven different skills to choose from, three of which have a follow-up skill.

=== Map objectives ===
There are five map objectives:

- CTI (Capture The Intelligence) – Known in other games as Capture The Flag. Players have to pick up an object (usually a suitcase) and bring it to their designated capture area. The opposing team can shoot down the player carrying the object after which it will drop to the ground to be picked up by another player or left to respawn when it is not picked up for a certain amount of time. Once brought inside the team's capture area, the team receives reinforcements and/or point depending on the map.
- PS (Push) – Players have to control a series of areas (marked with flags) in a particular order to complete the map objective. On most maps, the areas are situated near both teams' spawn area and closer to the center on the map, usually counting between 3 and 5 control areas. Depending on the map, teams are rewarded with reinforcements for capturing an area which was neutral or controlled by the opposite team. Teams can also receive reinforcement penalties when the team does not control more than half of the control areas. When one team controls all the areas in the map, that team is rewarded with reinforcements and/or points.
- SD (Search & Destroy) – The map objective in SD maps is to destroy certain objects which are usually located near the opposing team's spawning area. Objects range from crates with ammunition and guns to trucks. Some objects can be destroyed by simply doing damage to it, while others have to be destroyed with a claymore mine.
- TC (Territorial Control) Teams are rewarded with points and/or reinforcements when they control certain areas. Unlike the Push mode, players can capture any area regardless of which team controls the other areas. On some maps, players are awarded with points for every 30 seconds they control an area while on other maps, teams are rewarded with reinforcements every 30 seconds when every single area is controlled by that team.
- OBJ (Objective) – The last type of objective is a collective of objectives that do not fall under the other four types, or is a combination of different types of objectives. On most obj maps, players have to plant bombs in order to destroy certain map areas. The bombs can be defused within 30 seconds by the opposing team to prevent this.

== Development ==
Though development of the Quake version began in 1998, the Half-Life version of the mod was first publicly released in April, 2000. Version 2.1 was released on July 7, 2000. The final build is Release Candidate (RC) 3.0 which was released on April 18, 2005. FA was originally created by Caspar Milan Nielsen, Christian Øelund, and Brian Fuller. Versions 2.0 through (RC) 2.5 were developed under the leadership and lead programming of Eric Smith (Zerk). Firearms 2.4 was included in the Counter-Strike retail package and was later awarded PC Gamer's Mod of the Year award and PC Gamer's Best Multiplayer Game of the Year Runner-up in the year 2000. Firearms was at one time the #3 most popular mod based on the Half-Life engine, after Counter-Strike and Team Fortress Classic. Later versions, (RC) 2.6 through (RC) 3.0, were developed under the direction of Ben Irwin and Alex Jordan.

== Reception ==
PC Gamer US named Firearms the best mod of 2000. ModDB named it a runner up for Most Improved Mod of 2002.

== Successor ==
A successor mod, Firearms: Source, was created by a different development team for the Source engine. It was released on July 23, 2010. The initial release included eight maps, five game modes, and 31 weapons. Giochi per il mio computer gave the mod a rating of two out of five.
