= Dino D-Day =

2011 video game

- Promotional cover art featuring the Axis Panzer Styracosaurus
- Developers: 800 North; Digital Ranch
- Publishers: 800 North; Digital Ranch
- Engine: Source Engine
- Platform: Microsoft Windows
- Release: April 8, 2011
- Genre: First-person shooter
- Mode: Multiplayer

Dino D-Day is a multiplayer team-based first-person shooter video game developed and published by American studios 800 North and Digital Ranch. It was released for Microsoft Windows on April 8, 2011.

The premise of the game is that during World War II, Adolf Hitler found a way to resurrect dinosaurs for use in the war effort. Players can battle online choosing to serve either the Allied nations or Nazis. The game was described as a new twist on "the overdone World War II FPS [...] that has become a running joke in the industry and gaming press".

== Gameplay ==
The Allied team fights against a Tyrannosaurus rex

Dino D-Day is a first-person shooter where players join one of two teams of other players as they attempt to complete their goal. Players have the choice between the Allied nations or the Axis powers, the latter represented by the Nazis and their dinosaur soldiers. Upon the game's initial release, both the Allies and the Axis had six different classes of soldier. The Allied classes range from assault troops, medics and heavy support. However, the Axis have three human and three dinosaur classes. The human classes comprise assault troops, snipers, and medics; while the dinosaurs comprise an attack Velociraptor, Dilophosaurus, and a Desmatosuchus with a cannon mounted on its back. Additional classes were added to both teams at later dates bringing the total to seven classes for the Allies and nine for the Axis. The Allies gained a dinosaur class of their own, a Protoceratops with a mounted machine gun. The Axis gained a Stygimoloch with a mounted gun, a Compsognathus that acts as a kamikaze bomber with a grenade and a flying Microraptor. In certain maps, an Axis player can also be chosen at random to play as a Tyrannosaurus with a jaw-mounted machine gun. While originally powerful, the class originally counted as three kills in a team deathmatch.

The initial release consisted of five maps and three game modes that included: team deathmatch, where players must reach a set number of killed enemy players; king of the hill, where teams fight for control of a section of a map; and objective mode, where players are given specific goals to capture including a Fortress Objective where one Axis player takes control of a massive Styracosaurus with a Panzer IV turret mounted on its back and with his team must make it to their objective point while the allies must stop it with explosives.

== Development and release ==
Dino D-Day was developed using the Source game engine. It was initially released online in 2009, as a Half-Life 2 mod. It served as a prototype for an eventual commercial release, which was announced by developer 800 North Productions in December 2010. Digital Ranch also worked on the game.

A beta version was released via Steam on March 1, 2011. The full version had been scheduled to release on that day, although the development team held it back for further improvement. The full release occurred on April 8, 2011, via Steam. A significant update was released in late 2011, adding new maps, game modes, and other playable dinosaurs. Other updates have included bug fixes.

On September 29, 2014, the Last Stand DLC was released. It could be purchased for an extra charge and added new playable dinosaurs, two new maps, an upgrade system, and co-op survival gameplay. A new map and multiple fixes were added on July 16, 2017.

== Reception ==
Reception

Aggregate score
Aggregator	Score
Metacritic	53/100

Review scores
Publication	Score
IGN	5.5/10
PC Gamer (US)	50/100
PC PowerPlay	50/100
Multiplayer.it	6/10

Dino D-Day received mixed reviews. IndieGames.com wrote that the game works because it does not take its premise too seriously: "It's filled with little comedic touches and a fair bit of dark humor". Charles Onyett of IGN also praised the humor, but opined that players would quickly lose interest in the game. He criticized the "mediocre" maps, the small player base, and the presence of numerous glitches. He also criticized various aspects of the gameplay, stating that the dinosaurs seemed to have an advantage over humans and their weak weapons.

Volodia Pellegrini of Multiplayer.it praised the concept, viewing it as a combination of Jurassic Park and Indiana Jones. However, Pellegrini noted a small player base as well, stating that gameplay quickly becomes repetitive. PC PowerPlay called the game an "awesome idea" but with "amateur execution". Riley Black, writing for Smithsonian, was generally satisfied with the appearance of the dinosaurs but was disappointed in the lack of a single-player mode. PC Gamer compared the game to a dinosaur skeleton: "barebones, missing some pieces, and ancient-looking".

== In other media ==
In 2013, Icehouse Animation announced that it would produce a Dino D-Day animated series, and named Tommy Blacha as a writer for the show. The series has not been released.

On January 9, 2015, the first issue of the Dino D-Day comic was released. It tells the origin story of Jack Hardgrave and Nigel Blythe-Crossley as they attempt to uncover Hitler's dinosaur project hidden in a Nazi submarine base.

== See also ==
- List of Source engine mods
