= The Jaunt =

Short story by Stephen King originally published in 1981

- Short story by Stephen King
- Country: United States
- Language: English
- Genres: Horror, science fiction, Short story

Publication
- Published in: The Twilight Zone Magazine (June 1981); Skeleton Crew
- Publication type: Periodical
- Media type: Print (Magazine, Hardback and Paperback)
- Publication date: 1981

"The Jaunt" is a horror short story by Stephen King first published in The Twilight Zone Magazine in 1981, and collected in King's 1985 collection Skeleton Crew. The story takes place early in the 24th century, when the technology for teleportation, referred to as "the Jaunt", (Note: Always stylized with an uppercase J, along with its derived present participle "Jaunting" and past participle "Jaunted".) is commonplace, allowing for nearly instantaneous transportation across enormous distances, even to other planets in the Solar System. But the process is very specific, and has dire consequences if it goes wrong. The term "Jaunt" is stated within the short story to be a homage to The Stars My Destination, a science fiction novel by Alfred Bester.

== Plot ==
In the 24th century, humans have utilized a form of instantaneous teleportation technology called "the Jaunt", enabling immediate travel and colonization of the Solar System. Mark Oates and his family are preparing to travel to Mars for a two-year business trip. As the Jaunting service prepares the other passengers, Mark entertains his two children by recounting a semi-apocryphal tale of the discovery and history of the Jaunt. He explains how in 1987, a scientist named Victor Carune inadvertently discovered the ability to Jaunt after years of research when he accidentally teleported two of his own fingers. Although the procedure functioned perfectly when he tested inorganic objects, Carune discovered a side-effect on the mice sent through his two portals: The mice would either die instantly or behave erratically before dying moments later. He eventually discovered that beings of higher neural activity, such as animals and humans, could only survive the Jaunt while unconscious. Mark explains that this is why all people must undergo inhalational anesthetization before Jaunting.

Mark spares his children a gruesome account of the first conscious human to experience the Jaunt: A condemned death-row murderer named Rudy Foggia, who had been promised a full pardon upon taking part in the experiment. After six other inmates were Jaunted under the effects of anesthesia, Foggia emerged insane, saying that the Jaunt was an "eternity" before dying of a heart attack. Mark also excluded mentioning 30 other people who have Jaunted while conscious, voluntarily or otherwise. Each time, they either died instantly or emerged insane. Scientists had come to conclude that while Jaunting is physically carried out almost instantly, to a conscious mind it lasts an indeterminately long amount of time, assumed to be lasting "a hundred" to "a billion" years, leading to a conscious person simply being left alone with their thoughts in "an endless field of white". However, Mark attempts to present this fact in a gentle way as to not frighten his children or his wife as, unlike him, they are Jaunting for the first time.

After Mark finishes his story, the family is anesthetized and Jaunted to Mars. Upon awakening, Mark is horrified to find that his son Ricky deliberately held his breath while being given the anesthetic to experience the Jaunt while conscious and has been rendered completely insane, his hair turned white and his irises turned gold. Ricky says that Mark has no comprehension of how long he had been there, cackling "Longer than you think, Dad!" and gouges his own eyes out before he is wheeled away from his horrified family by several attendants.

== Television adaptation ==
In 2015, it was announced that the story was set for a film adaptation by Andy Muschietti before he opted to realise King's It instead.

In 2021, MRC and Fear The Walking Dead co-creator Dave Erickson optioned the story for TV adaptation.

== See also ==
- Stephen King short fiction bibliography
- Emesis Blue
