= Half-Life 2: Capture the Flag =

- Developer: HL2:CTF team
- Series: Half-Life 2
- Engine: Source
- Platforms: Microsoft Windows, Linux
- Release: December 8, 2011
- Genre: Action
- Mode: Multiplayer

Half-Life 2: Capture The Flag is a multiplayer team-based capture the flag mod developed around Half-Life 2. The public beta version was released on February 23, 2005. The latest version of the mod was released to the public on December 8, 2011. On October 16, 2013, Half-Life 2: Capture The Flag was greenlit on Steam Greenlight.

== Gameplay ==
The game features seven unique modes of play, each dividing the players into two teams: The Combine as Blue team and The Rebels as Orange team where the teams fight each other over the flag(s). Players are provided with thirteen weapons, seven unique power-ups (referred to as "Runes"), enhanced player movement features and a gravity gun to help accomplish the goal of capturing the other team's flag.

The overall gameplay in the mod attempts to mimic all of the traditional capture the flag features presented in other video games while providing features unique to itself. Gameplay features such as the ability to pass the flag long distances, wall jumping and use of the gravity gun to manipulate props as a weapon combine to expand upon the traditional capture the flag gameplay found in other action games with a capture the flag game mode.

There are seven modes of play: Capture the Flag (CTF), One-Flag (1F), Domination (DOM), Football (FB), Territorial Control (TC), Capture Point (CP) and Attackers versus Defenders (AVD).

== Development ==
The co-founders of the Half-Life 2: Capture the Flag Project are Andrew Blevins and Patrick Flanagan who produced the popular game mod for Quake III Arena called Q3 Gridiron which is a chaotic game mod based on American football and referred to as "Football with Rocket Launchers." After the successful release of the Q3 Gridiron game modification, the two built a second game mod for Quake 3 named xCTF which was never completed as they decided to build a capture the flag mod on the then (2004) newly released Half-Life 2 Source SDK which ultimately was released as Half-Life 2: Capture the Flag.

Since the original beta development of the mod, many other players, designers and programmers have come forward to contribute to the project. Many of the developers have gone on to work in their respective disciplines for large gaming companies and other game modification projects. The full list of developers, play testers and the full history of the mod can be found in the HL2CTF_readme.txt included in the game mod installation file.

== Reception ==
Half-Life 2: Capture the Flag met with positive reviews upon release. Several gaming websites and print media gave the game praise.

- PC Gamer published an article in the July 2005 edition of the magazine and included an early version of the mod on the attached game demo disk for that month.
- ModDB called HL2:CTF "The best multiplayer Half-Life 2 experience you are going to run across. Period."
- Planet Half-Life states that HL2:CTF "Provides an incredibly fun, action-packed experience for players of all levels of skill."
