= Research and Development (video game mod) =

2009 Half-Life mod and puzzle game

- Screenshot showing a vehicle the player must build to complete the game
- Developer: Matt Bortolino
- Engine: Source
- Platform: Windows
- Release: July 17, 2009
- Genre: Puzzle

Research and Development is a free mod for the first-person shooter video game Half-Life 2: Episode Two. Developed by Matt Bortolino and released on July 17, 2009, it is a non-violent first-person puzzle video game, and has been compared to Portal. It received critical praise for its unique gameplay and high development quality.

== Plot ==
The game does not have an overt story; the player wakes up as an unnamed character in a detailed but generic location, not knowing how they got there, and must start solving puzzles in order to escape.

== Gameplay ==
The mod takes place in the Half-Life universe, but strips the player of their weapons, giving them only a Gravity Gun and antlion bait. The player must solve puzzles to traverse the levels, to the point where the game resembles a point-and-click adventure.

== Development ==
Research and Development utilizes similar puzzles as those seen in between the shooter gameplay in Half-Life 2, but turns them into an entire game.

== Reception ==
Alec Meer of Rock, Paper, Shotgun called the game "as must-play as an [Half-Life 2] mod gets", and stated that the game's non-combative player character is "in many ways more keeping with the mind-over-matter character we're often told Gordon Freeman is than the openly, incongruously murderous role he dons in Valve's games". Nick Breckon of Shacknews recommended the game, praising its "refreshing amount of original mechanics and crafted special effects". Tom Sykes of PC Gamer called the game one of the best Half-Life 2 single-player mods, saying that it is "surprising just how easily Half-Life 2's toolset translates" to the new focus of puzzles. Gry Online called the game's puzzles "ingenious", remarking that their solutions were completely logical. Anthony Burch of Destructoid stated that the game "provides clever fun in a way very few games - never mind how many modifications - are capable of," and that he "almost [felt] guilty playing this game for free," criticizing some bugs in the game, but calling its final levels "spectacular".
