= Source Filmmaker =

Video capture and editing application

- Source Filmmaker UI, beta release
- Developer: Valve
- Release: 27 June 2012; 14 years ago
- Preview release: 0.9.8.4 / 15 May 2020; 6 years ago
- Written in: C/C++
- Engine: Source
- Operating system: Microsoft Windows
- Size: 15.71 GB
- Available in: English
- Type: 3D computer graphics software
- License: Freeware
- Website: sourcefilmmaker.com

Source Filmmaker (SFM) is a free 3D computer graphics software tool developed and published by Valve for creating animated films, which uses the Source game engine. Source Filmmaker has been used to create many community-based animated shorts for various Source games, such as Team Fortress 2, the Left 4 Dead series, and Half-Life 2.

== Overview ==
Source Filmmaker is a tool for animating, editing and rendering 3D animated videos using assets from most games which use the Source engine, such as sounds, models, and, backdrops. SFM also allows for the creation of still images, art, and posters.

SFM contains three different user interfaces and a "work camera" for previewing an active scene. The three interfaces are used for creating clips, controlling animation, and making fine-tuned adjustments, which include:

- The Clip Editor; for recording, editing, and arranging shots. They hold the user's recorded gameplay and virtual assets. It also allows the user to place and arrange sound files and video filters.
- The Motion Editor; for motion adjustments over time such as blending two animations. Users can also use motion presets to select paths and manipulate different scene objects, play clips at different times, and puppeteer the characters in different positions and frames.
- The Graph Editor; for editing motion by creating keyframes that can be used for pose-to-pose animation.

Users can either create new projects or import data from Source-based games to extend their SFM animations. SFM also supports several cinematographic effects and techniques such as motion blur, Tyndall effects, dynamic lighting, and depth of field. Users can also use inverse kinematics to manually animate movements.

More advanced users can use Source's official modding tools to create environments, import new models and characters, change textures, and make scripts that make their workflow easier.

== Production and updates ==
=== Pre-release ===
SFM was developed internally at Valve in 2005 and most of it was based on the code from the in-game demo playback tool found in Source. SFM was used to make Day of Defeat: Source trailers with effects that could not be achieved in real-time. The tool was used extensively for certain promotional materials for the release of Team Fortress 2, particularly the Meet the Team trailers. This version of SFM, which ran using Source's in-game tools framework, was unintentionally leaked during the public beta of Team Fortress 2 in September 2007. By 2010, the entire interface was re-implemented using Qt 4 and given its engine branch for further development.

Before SFM was released to the public, Team Fortress 2 carried a simplified version of SFM known as the "Replay Editor", which was limited to capturing the actual events occurring throughout a player's life. It provided no ability to modify actions, repeat segments, or apply special effects beyond those already used in-game. However, arbitrary camera angles were possible, such as tracking the movements of other players in action at the time. The Replay Editor also allowed users to upload completed videos to YouTube.

On June 27, 2012, SFM became available on a limited basis through Steam, the same day the final Meet the Team video "Meet the Pyro" was released. The open beta for Windows was released as of July 11, 2012. From 2011 to 2018, Valve operated a competition known as the Saxxy Awards for community-made SFM animations. Winners were awarded an in-game item in Team Fortress 2 called a Saxxy, which resembles an Oscar Statuette in the likeness of the Team Fortress 2 character Saxton Hale. The Saxxy can be used as a melee weapon, and is one of only three in-game items to possess the unique effect of turning enemy players into gold if killed by someone wielding one.

=== Other updates ===
On April 1, 2013, Valve implemented support for the Steam Workshop, which allows users to upload their custom-made assets onto the Steam community. These assets range from video game models and sound to animation project files.

A version of the software for Valve's Source 2 engine, known as Source 2 Filmmaker, was released on May 15, 2020, alongside other development tools for Half-Life: Alyx.

In February 2023, Facepunch announced they were producing their own successor to SFM due to compatibility issues with their own game platform, S&box. S&box, like Half-Life: Alyx, runs on the Source 2 engine.

== Notable works ==
The Saxxy awards were given to a total of 33 winners, ranging from comedic or action shorts to extended short films across a variety of genres. Longer films produced with the software include Darkest Days, an hour-long jukebox musical based on Left 4 Dead 2, and Emesis Blue, a 108-minute psychological horror feature film based on Team Fortress 2.

== See also ==
- Saxxy Awards
- Machinima
- Garry's Mod
- Skibidi Toilet
