= Counter-Strike: Malvinas =

Counter-Strike:Source map

Malvinas
- First appearance: Counter-Strike: Source
- Created by: Dattatec
- Based on: Falkland Islands
- Genre: First-person shooter

Counter-Strike: Malvinas (Note: "Malvinas" is the Argentinian name for the Falkland Islands.) is an unofficial multiplayer video game map for Counter-Strike: Source, developed and distributed by Argentinian web hosting company Dattatec. The map was released on March 4, 2013 and was created using the Source game engine. The map is set in Stanley, the capital of the Falkland Islands, and revolves around a group of Argentine special forces capturing the archipelago from British terrorists. Counter-Strike: Malvinas pays homage to the 1982 Falklands War, in which an estimated 650 Argentine and 255 British servicemen died. The map prompted strong controversy in the United Kingdom; Dattatec's website was targeted by British hackers on March 27, 2013.

== Gameplay ==
A screenshot of gameplay. Stanley Cathedral can be seen in the foreground.

Like the other maps in the game, players are divided into two teams: Terrorists and Counter-Terrorists. The Terrorists have a limited time in which to plant and detonate a bomb; the Counter-Terrorists try to stop them from planting the bomb or to defuse it if it has already been planted. Each team consists of two opposing groups of four players.

Counter-Strike: Malvinas is set in a 2013 recreation of Stanley (referred to in-game as "Puerto Argentino", its Argentine name), the capital of the Falkland Islands. The map features landmarks such as Stanley Cathedral and war memorials dedicated to the Falklands War. The Argentine team spawns near the cathedral, whereas the opposing British team begins in the Argentine graveyard.

== Background and release ==
Fernando Llorente, a spokesman for Dattatec, stated that on March 27, 2013, two of the company's websites were attacked using DDoS, with hackers attempting to "saturate" the domain's connection. Llorente further revealed that the attack was 5 gigabits per second in strength; the equivalent of 5000 PCs connecting to both websites at the same time every second, although he admitted that Dattatec's technical team eventually blocked the attack. In a statement issued on 28 March 2013, Llorente stated that:

Generally these attacks come from eastern Europe and China, but we detected that most, although not all, of the IP addresses used this time were from the UK. At Dattatec we habitually receive different scopes of attack – this is the first one that has come mainly from the UK, although I cannot affirm that it was a case of cyber warfare. We think diplomacy should prevail between Argentina and the UK and we do not fear another attack – when someone tries to hit a server and is blocked, they do not try again.
