= Team Fortress 2 =

2007 video game

- Promotional art showing the nine playable classes, with the Heavy in the center
- Developer: Valve
- Publisher: Valve
- Designers: John Cook; Robin Walker
- Artist: Moby Francke
- Composer: Mike Morasky
- Engine: Source
- Platforms: Windows; Xbox 360; PlayStation 3; macOS (Note: Deprecated as the port was removed entirely from Steam and can no longer be supported with versions Catalina 10.15 or newer.); Linux
- Release: October 10, 2007: Windows, Xbox 360 (The Orange Box); NA: October 10, 2007; EU: October 18, 2007; AU: October 25, 2007; PlayStation 3 (The Orange Box); AU: November 22, 2007; EU: November 23, 2007; NA: December 11, 2007; macOS; WW: June 10, 2010; Linux; WW: February 14, 2013
- Genre: First-person shooter
- Modes: Single-player, multiplayer

Team Fortress 2 is a 2007 multiplayer first-person shooter game developed and published by Valve Corporation. It is the sequel to the 1996 Team Fortress mod for Quake and the 1999 game Team Fortress Classic. It was released in October 2007 as part of The Orange Box for Windows and the Xbox 360, and was ported to the PlayStation 3 in December 2007. It was released as a standalone game for Windows in April 2008, and updated to support macOS in June 2010 and Linux in February 2013. It was made free-to-play in June 2011, and is distributed online through Valve's digital retailer, Steam. (Note: The console versions were distributed and managed by Electronic Arts. The PlayStation 3 servers were taken offline in early 2023.)

Players join one of two teams—RED and BLU—and choose one of nine character classes to play as in game modes such as capture the flag and king of the hill. Its development was led by John Cook and Robin Walker, the developers of the original Team Fortress mod. Team Fortress 2 was announced in 1998 under the name Team Fortress 2: Brotherhood of Arms. Initially, it had more realistic, militaristic visuals and gameplay, but this changed over the protracted nine years of development. After Valve released no information for six years, Team Fortress 2 regularly featured in Wired News's annual vaporware list. Finally released on Valve's game engine, Source, in 2007, Team Fortress 2 preserved much of the core class-based gameplay of its predecessors while featuring an overhauled, cartoonish visual style influenced by the works of J. C. Leyendecker, Dean Cornwell, and Norman Rockwell, alongside an increased focus on the visual and verbal characterization of its playable classes and what the developers have described as a 1960s spy film aesthetic.

Team Fortress 2 has received critical acclaim for its art direction, gameplay, humor, and use of character in a wholly multiplayer game, and since its release has been referred to as one of the greatest video games ever created. It has gained a dedicated online following, with fan-works featuring the characters being mostly uploaded to YouTube, in addition to being annually showcased in Valve's Saxxy Awards film contest. It is also considered the main forerunner to the now-highly popular hero shooter genre, having laid the groundwork for its formula and pioneered many of its staple features.

It continues to receive official Valve server support as of 2025, in addition to new content being released on a seasonal basis in the form of submissions made through the Steam Workshop. Since becoming free-to-play, its main source of revenue is microtransactions for in-game cosmetics. A "drop system" was also added and refined, allowing free-to-play users to periodically receive in-game equipment and items. Though it has had an unofficial competitive scene since its release, both support for official competitive play through ranked matchmaking and an overhauled casual experience were added in July 2016. From early 2020 to mid-2024, cheating bots overrunning Valve's official matchmaking servers led to fans holding several online protests, and eventually Valve adding new policies regarding game bans.

== Gameplay ==
A group of RED players attacking BLU spawn on "Well"

In most game modes, two teams, RED (Reliable Excavation and Demolition) and BLU (Builders League United), compete for a combat-based objective. Players can choose to play as one of nine character classes in these teams, each with its own unique strengths, weaknesses, and weapon sets (additional weapons can be obtained via periodic free item drops, achievements, crafting, unboxing, or direct purchase from the in-game store). In order to accomplish objectives efficiently, a balance of these classes is required due to how these strengths and weaknesses interact with each other in a team-based environment. Random critical hits cause some weapons' base damages to occasionally triple. Although the abilities of a number of classes changed from earlier Team Fortress incarnations, the basic elements of each class remained, those being one primary weapon, one secondary weapon, and one melee weapon. The game was released with six official maps, although over one hundred maps have since been included in subsequent updates, including community-created maps. When a player chooses a game-mode for the first time, an introductory video is played, showing how to complete its objectives. During matches, the Administrator, voiced by Ellen McLain, announces the teams' current objectives over loudspeakers. The player limit for one match is 16 on the Xbox 360 and PlayStation 3, and was initially 24 on the Windows edition. In 2008, the Windows edition was updated to include a server variable that allows for up to 32 players, and a 2023 update increased the server maximum to 100 players.

Team Fortress 2 is the first of Valve's multiplayer games to provide detailed statistics for individual players, such as the total amount of time spent playing as each class, most points obtained, and most objectives completed in a single life. Persistent statistics tell the player how they are performing in relation to these statistics, such as if a player comes close to their record for the damage inflicted in a single round. Team Fortress 2 also features numerous achievements for carrying out certain tasks, such as achieving a certain number of kills or completing a specific objective. Sets of class-specific achievements have been added in updates, which can award weapons to the player upon completion. This unlockable system has since been expanded into a random drop system, with which players can also obtain items simply by playing the game.

=== Game modes ===
==== Core game modes ====
Team Fortress 2 contains five core game modes.

- Attack/Defend (A/D) is a timed game mode in which the BLU team's goal is to capture RED's control points. The number of control points varies between maps, and the points must be captured by the BLU team, usually in sequence. To capture a control point, a player must stand on it for a certain amount of time, with more players increasing the speed it is being captured at. RED, who cannot capture points, must prevent BLU from capturing all the control points before the time-limit expires. Once a point is captured, the time-limit will be extended by several minutes.
- Capture the Flag (CTF) is a mode in which RED and BLU must steal the opposing team's flag (an intelligence briefcase) and prevent their own intelligence from being stolen. When the intelligence is dropped by the carrier, it will stay on the ground for 1 minute before returning to its original location if it is not picked up again. A team's intelligence can be carried only by the opposing team. The first team to capture the enemy's intelligence three times wins.
- Control Points (CP) is a timed game mode where there are several control points placed around the map, with three (3CP) or five (5CP) control points in total depending on the map. The game will start off with only the middle control point being available for capture, with the other control points split equally among both teams. Once this middle control point is captured, a team can begin capturing the enemy team's points in respective order. The time limit is extended on the capture of a control point by either team. For a team to win, they must capture all the control points within the time limit.
- King of the Hill (KOTH) is a timed game mode that contains a single control point at the middle of the map that can be captured by both RED and BLU. Should the opposing team capture the point from the team that had it before, their timer will stop and the opposing team's timer will begin or resume. The point can be recaptured by each team as many times as is possible. The first team to control the point for 180 seconds (not necessarily continuous) wins.
- Payload (PL) is a timed game mode where BLU must push an explosive cart along a track, while RED must prevent the cart from reaching their base. To push the cart, at least one BLU player must be in range of the cart, with more players increasing the push speed. Maps have multiple 'checkpoints' along the track; each checkpoint reached by the cart awards the BLU team with additional time. If the cart is not pushed by BLU for some time, it will begin to roll back to the last achieved checkpoint. RED players can obstruct the cart from being pushed by being within range of it.

==== Alternative game modes ====
There are several alternative game modes in Team Fortress 2. These modes consist of a small number of maps and detach from the core game modes in some way.

- Arena is a special game mode in which players do not respawn upon death. A team can win either by eliminating all opposing players, or by claiming a single capture point that opens after a certain time has elapsed. This mode is currently unavailable through matchmaking, but is still accessible through community servers.
- Mannpower is a mode in which players have access to a grappling hook and assorted power-ups laid around the map that grant unique abilities. While not bound to any specific mode, all current official Mannpower maps use a variation of Capture the Flag. In Mannpower's variation of Capture the Flag, both teams have an intelligence flag, and the first team to capture the enemy's intelligence ten times wins. The mode is based on the Quake mod 'Threewave CTF' created by former Valve employee David Kirsch.
- Medieval Mode is a mode in which players are restricted to using melee and support weapons, with certain exceptions for medieval-themed projectile weapons. While not bound to any specific mode, the official Medieval Mode maps use variations of Attack/Defend. If Medieval Mode is enabled on a map, select phrases spoken by players in the in-game text chat will be replaced with more thematic variants, such as "hello" being replaced with "well meteth".
- PASS Time is a unique timed game mode inspired by rugby, developed by Valve, Bad Robot Interactive, and Escalation Studios. Three unique goals (the Run-In, Throw-In, and Bonus Goals) are placed on each team's side of the map. A single ball called the JACK will spawn at the center of the map, and players must pick it up and carry it to the opposing team's side. While holding the JACK, players cannot fire their weapons, but passive effects are still applied. Players can score a goal by either carrying the JACK to a Run-In Goal or by throwing the JACK through the Throw-In Goal. Three goals can be scored by throwing the JACK through the Bonus Goal, which is much more difficult to score. To win, a team must either score five goals, or have the most goals when the timer runs out.
- Payload Race (PLR) is similar to Payload, but both the RED and BLU teams have a cart that they must push, while preventing the opposing team from doing the same. There are multiple checkpoints along the track, and there is no time limit. The team to reach the end of their track first wins a point. The game lasts until one team gets two points.
- Player Destruction (PD) is a community-made game mode in which a player's death causes a pickup to appear. The first team to collect a set number of pickups and deliver them to a drop-off point wins the game. The players on each team with the most pickups are highlighted for everyone to see, and gain a passive healing effect for themselves and any nearby teammates.
- Special Delivery is a mode similar to Capture the Flag, but there is only one neutral briefcase that can be picked up both the RED and BLU teams. Upon a team picking up the briefcase, the opposing team will be unable to pick up the briefcase until it has been dropped for 45 seconds and respawns as a neutral briefcase. A team wins by carrying the briefcase onto a loading platform, which will gradually rise until the platform reaches its peak.
- Territorial Control consists of several control points spread out across a single map. Like Control Points, each point can be captured by either the RED or BLU teams. Unlike Control Points, only two points are accessible at a single time. Upon a team's successful capture of a point, the "stage" ends and the accessible capture points change. When a team only has control of a single control point, they are blocked from capturing the opposing team's control point and the team must wait until the time limit is up and the accessible capture points change. A team wins by capturing all the control points.
- Versus Saxton Hale (VSH) is a juggernaut game mode that originated as a mod for the Arena mode developed by LizardOfOz, which was then popularized on community servers. It puts one player as Saxton Hale (on BLU) against up to 31 other players (on RED). Saxton Hale is restricted to melee attacks, but he can perform a Brave Jump (double jump), a charge attack that allows him to fly in any direction, a body slam that creates a damaging shockwave upon landing, and a super punch, which deals more damage than a regular punch. Like in Arena, Saxton or RED can win by eliminating the opposing player(s), or by capturing a single control point after enough time elapses.

==== Other game modes ====
These modes are not categorized with the other modes, and instead have their own separate sections in the game.

- Halloween Mode is a special mode that is enabled during Halloween, and allows the players access to more than 60 Halloween-themed maps, Halloween-exclusive cosmetics and challenges. For example, Halloween 2012 included a difficult Mann vs. Machine mission involving destroying more than 800 enemy forces. Owing to popular demand of the Halloween events, Valve later added the Full Moon event, an event that triggers around every full moon phase throughout the year, which allows players to equip Halloween-exclusive cosmetics. In 2013, Valve introduced an item called Eternaween, and upon use, allows players of a specific server to use Halloween-exclusive cosmetics for 2 hours.
- Mann vs Machine (MvM) is a cooperative game mode where players must defend their base from waves of robots modeled after all nine playable classes, and in some maps, slow-moving tanks carrying bombs. Robots and tanks drop a currency referred to as Credits upon their death, which players can use to buy upgrades for themselves or their weapons. The players win upon successfully defending their base from the bomb until the last wave. A paid version of this game mode called "Mann Up" is also available, where players buy "Tour Of Duty Tickets" with real money to play a series of missions with the chance to win unique cosmetics, weapons and robot parts that can be used in crafting.
- Offline Practice Mode consists of the player and computer-controlled bots. The number of bots, their difficulty, and the map can all be adjusted to a player's preference, though only a select amount of maps and gamemodes are available to play.
- Training Mode exists to help new players get acquainted with basic controls, and teaches them the basics of four of the nine classes, Soldier, Demoman, Engineer and Spy. It uses wooden dummies and bots to teach players the basic mechanics of classes and the game.

=== Competitive play ===
Team Fortress 2 is played competitively through multiple leagues. While formalized competitive gameplay is very different from normal Team Fortress 2, it offers an environment with a much higher level of teamwork than in public servers. Most teams use voice chat to communicate, and use a combination of strategy, communication, and mechanical skill to win against other teams. Community-run competitive leagues also tend to feature restrictions such as item bans and class limits. These leagues are often supported by Valve via in-game medals (which are submitted via the Steam Workshop) and announcements on the official blog. The previous North American league, ESEA, supported a paid Team Fortress 2 league, with $42,000 in prizes for the top teams in 2017. However, due to the relative lack of players in its TF2 leagues, ESEA announced its intent to shut down the TF2 leagues on April 17, 2019. As of May 2025, the popular leagues include RGL and UGC for North America, ETF2L for Europe, AsiaFortress for East Asia and SEA, and OzFortress for Oceania.

In April 2015, Valve announced that a dedicated competitive mode would be added to Team Fortress 2, utilizing skill-based matchmaking; closed beta testing began in the following year. The competitive mode was added in the "Meet Your Match" update, released on July 7, 2016. Ranked matches are played six-vs-six, with players ranked in thirteen ranks based on win/losses and an assessment of their skills. Ranked matchmaking will balance players based on their ranks and rating. A similar matchmaking approach has been added for casual games for matches of 12-vs-12 players, but uses a hidden value. In order to join competitive matchmaking, players must have associated their Steam account with the Steam Guard Mobile Authenticator, as well as having a Team Fortress 2 "premium account", which is unlocked by either having bought the game before it went free-to-play or by having made an in-game item purchase since.

=== Formats ===
Team Fortress 2 is played in a variety of different formats, which dictate the maximum size and composition of a team and can drastically change the impact of a single player's gameplay or choice of class. The two most basic formats consist of 12v12 and 6v6 ("Sixes"), the two being used on official Valve servers for casual and competitive modes respectively with no additional limitations. Most competitive leagues host Sixes but include limits on certain classes and weapons to preserve traditional, skill-based playstyles, for example limiting the allowed amount of Medics or Demomen to one on either team or banning certain movement-enhancing weapons from use. Other popular formats include "Highlander", a 9v9 format with a limit of one player per each of the nine classes, as well as a Sixes-inspired 7v7 variant thereof known as "Prolander" to allow for strategically switching classes during a competitive game.

== Characters and setting ==
Left to right: Pyro, Engineer, Spy, Heavy, Sniper, Scout, Soldier, Demoman, and Medic

Team Fortress 2 features nine playable classes, which are evenly split and categorized into "Offense", "Defense", and "Support". Each class has strengths and weaknesses and must work with other classes to be efficient, encouraging strategy and teamwork. Each class has at least three default weapons: a primary weapon, secondary weapon, and melee weapon. Engineers and Spies have two additional slots; for Engineers, their PDAs, and for Spies, their disguise kit and invisibility watch. An additional character, Saxton Hale, is playable in the "Versus Saxton Hale" game mode.

=== Offense ===
- The Scout (Nathan Vetterlein) is an American baseball fan and street runner from Boston, Massachusetts, who practiced running to be faster than his seven siblings. He is a fast, agile character, who is armed by default with a scattergun, a pistol, and a baseball bat. The Scout can double jump, and is counted twice when capturing control points and when pushing the Payload cart, doubling their speeds.
- The Soldier (Rick May) is an American jingoistic patriot from the Midwestern United States who portrays himself as a military-man (despite never having served in the U.S. Armed Forces). The Soldier is armed by default with a rocket launcher, a shotgun, and a shovel. He is both the second-slowest class in the game and the class with the second-highest health, after the Heavy. The Soldier can use his rocket launcher to "rocket jump" to other locations at the cost of some health.
- The Pyro (Dennis Bateman) is a pyromaniac of unknown gender and origin who wears a fire-retardant suit and a voice-muffling gas mask. By default, the Pyro carries a flamethrower, a shotgun, and a fire axe. The Pyro's flamethrower can also produce blasts of compressed air which repel nearby enemies and projectiles, and extinguish burning teammates. The Pyro is deluded and believes they are living in a utopian fantasy world called "Pyroland".

=== Defense ===
- The Demoman (Gary Schwartz) is a Black Scottish one-eyed alcoholic demolitions expert from Ullapool, Scotland. Armed by default with a grenade launcher, a "stickybomb" launcher (bombs that are detonated when prompted to by the player, and can stick to most surfaces), and a glass bottle of scrumpy, the Demoman can use his explosives to provide indirect fire and set traps. Similar to the Soldier's rocket jump, the Demoman can use his stickybombs to "sticky jump" at the cost of some health.
- The Heavy Weapons Guy, or simply the Heavy (Schwartz), is a large Russian man from the Dzhugdzhur Mountains of the Soviet Union who is obsessed with firepower. He is the slowest class, and can both absorb and deal substantial amounts of damage. His default weapons consist of a minigun that he affectionately refers to as "Sasha", a shotgun, and his fists.
- The Engineer (Grant Goodeve) is an American inventor, engineer, and "good ol' boy" from Bee Cave, Texas. The Engineer can deploy buildings to support his team: a sentry gun for defending key points, a health and ammunition dispenser, and a pair of teleporters (one entrance and one exit). The Engineer is armed by default with a shotgun, a pistol, and a wrench, which functions as both a melee weapon and to repair and upgrade his buildings. He carries two PDAs; one to erect his buildings and one to remotely destroy them.

=== Support ===
- The Medic (Robin Atkin Downes) is a German doctor from Stuttgart with little regard for the Hippocratic Oath. He is equipped with a "Medi Gun", which can restore health to injured teammates. When healing teammates, the Medi Gun progressively builds an "ÜberCharge" meter, which, when fully charged, can be activated to provide the Medic and his patient with temporary invulnerability. The Medic is also equipped by default with a syringe gun and a bonesaw for situations in which he must engage in direct combat.
- The Sniper (John Patrick Lowrie) is an ocker assassin born in New Zealand and raised in the Australian outback, equipped by default with a sniper rifle to shoot enemies from afar. Depending on how the player aims and fires, he can cause massive damage or instantly kill an opponent via a headshot. By default, he also carries a submachine gun and a kukri for close combat.
- The Spy (Dennis Bateman) is a French covert operative who carries an invisibility device disguised as a wristwatch, an electronic sapper to disable and destroy enemy Engineers' buildings, and a device in his cigarette case that allows him to disguise himself as any player on either team. His default weaponry consists of a revolver and a butterfly knife; he is able to use the latter to instantly kill enemies by stabbing them in the back.

=== Other ===
- Saxton Hale (JB Blanc in "Jungle Inferno", Matthew Simmons in-game) is an Australian adventurer and businessman who is the chief executive officer of the fictional Mann Co., a large shipping company which specializes in manufacturing munitions and hats. Saxton is known for his hypermasculine personality and physique, and his Australia-shaped chest-hair. He is playable only in the "Versus Saxton Hale" game mode, which was added in 2023 and in which he has a large pool of health and superhuman abilities, including immense strength and agility. Saxton can attack only with his fists, but is able to double-jump like the Scout.

=== Non-playable characters ===
- The Administrator or the Announcer (Ellen McLain) is an unseen announcer who provides timely information about time limits and objectives to players.
- Miss Pauling (Ashly Burch), the Administrator's assistant.
- The Horseless Headless Horsemann, Monoculus (Schwartz), Merasmus and the Bombinomicon (both Nolan North), serve as the antagonists of the Game's Annual Halloween Events.
- Zepheniah Mann (North) was the founder and original CEO of Mann Co. After his sons, Redmond and Blutarch, convinced him to buy massive lands in New Mexico, he traveled to the land, suffering and eventually succumbing to several diseases. In his will, he left his company to his aide and tracker, Barnabus Hale, and the worthless lands in New Mexico to his sons, knowing fully well they would not be able to share.
- Redmond and Blutarch Mann (both North) are the identical twin sons of Zepheniah and founders of the companies Reliable Excavation Demolition (RED) and Builders' League United (BLU) respectively. From a young age, they both had a strong sibling rivalry, and when their father forced them to share the lands in New Mexico in his will, this led to a conflict between them called the "Gravel War", a stalemate for control that would last over a hundred years (as both brothers used immortality machines with the intention of outliving each other), and it only ended when they were both murdered by their long-lost third brother, Gray Mann.

=== Setting ===
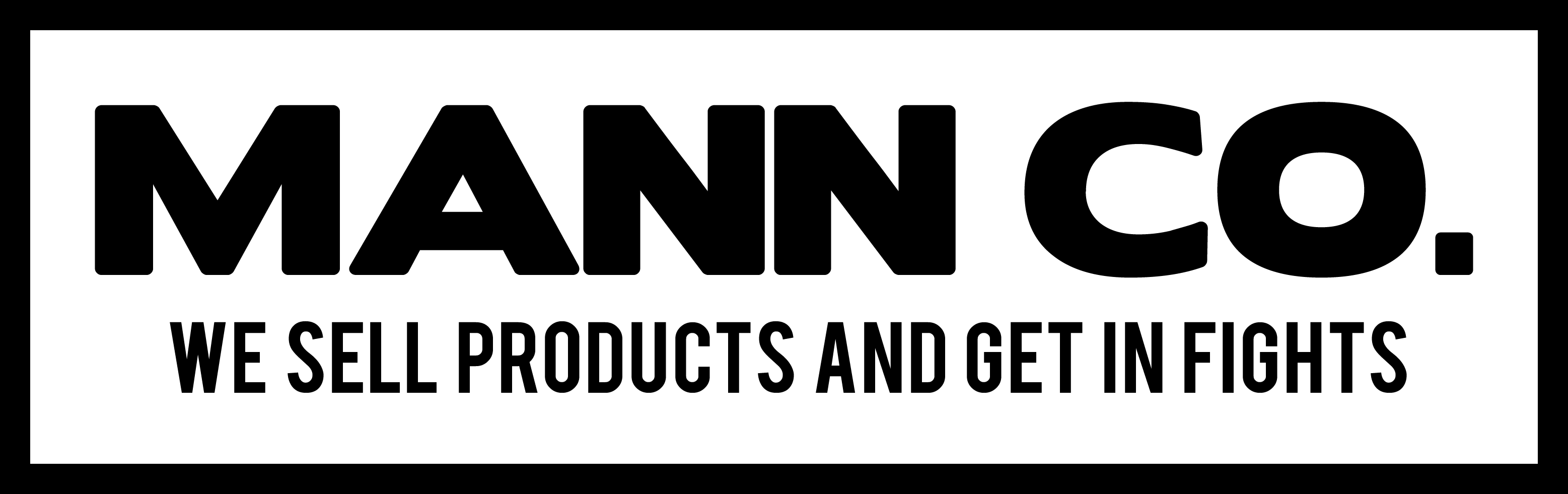
Logo and motto of the fictional Mann Co.

Although Team Fortress 2 is designed as an open-ended multiplayer experience without an active storyline, the game and additional material feature a wider narrative centered around Mann Co. The main player-versus-player gamemodes are set during the "Gravel Wars", a conflict between the rival heirs Redmond and Blutarch Mann for which the nine playable characters were hired as mercenaries. Gray Mann later emerges as the third competitor, killing his two brothers and forcing Saxton Hale to rehire the mercenaries to protect Mann Co. from Gray's robot army in the Mann vs Machine cooperative horde-shooter mode.

== Development ==
=== Origins ===
The original Team Fortress was developed by the Australian team TF Software, comprising Robin Walker and John Cook, as a free mod for the 1996 PC game Quake. In 1998, Walker and Cook were employed by Valve, which had just released its first game, Half-Life. Valve began developing Team Fortress 2 as an expansion pack for Half-Life using Valve's GoldSrc engine, and gave a release date for the end of the year. In 1999, Valve released Team Fortress Classic, a port of the original Team Fortress, as a free Half-Life mod. Team Fortress Classic was developed using the publicly available Half-Life software development kit as an example to the community and industry of its flexibility.

Team Fortress 2 was originally going to feature a realistic visual style

Valve originally planned Team Fortress 2 to have a modern war aesthetic. It would feature innovations including a command hierarchy with a Commander class, parachute drops over enemy territory, and networked voice communication. The Commander class played similarly to a real-time strategy game; the player viewed the game from a bird's-eye perspective and issued orders to players and AI-controlled soldiers. The Commander class was eventually abandoned because players would simply disobey the orders.

Team Fortress 2 was first shown at E3 1999 as Team Fortress 2: Brotherhood of Arms, where Valve showcased new technologies including parametric animation, which blended animations for smoother, more lifelike movement, and Intel's multi-resolution mesh technology, which dynamically reduced the detail of distant on-screen elements to improve performance. The game earned several awards including Best Online Game and Best Action Game.

In mid-2000, Valve announced that Team Fortress 2 had been delayed for a second time. They attributed the delay to development switching to its new in-house engine, Source. Following the announcement, Valve released no news on the game for six years. Walker and Cook worked on various other Valve projects; Walker was project lead on Half-Life 2: Episode One and Cook worked on Valve's content distribution platform, Steam. Team Fortress 2 became a prominent example of vaporware, a long-anticipated game that had seen years of development, and was often mentioned alongside another much-delayed game, Duke Nukem Forever. Walker said that Valve built three or four different versions of Team Fortress 2 before settling on their final design. Shortly before the release of Half-Life 2 in 2004, Valve's marketing director, Doug Lombardi, confirmed that Team Fortress 2 was still in development.

=== Final design and release ===
Valve reintroduced Team Fortress 2 at the EA Summer Showcase event in July 2006. Departing from the realistic visual design of other Valve games, Team Fortress 2 features a cartoon-like visual style influenced by 20th-century commercial illustrations and the artwork of J. C. Leyendecker, Dean Cornwell, and Norman Rockwell, achieved through Gooch shading. The game debuted with the Source engine's new dynamic lighting, shadowing, and soft particle technologies alongside Half-Life 2: Episode Two. It was the first game to implement the Source engine's new facial animation features. Valve abandoned the realistic style when it became impossible to reconcile it with the unrealistic gameplay, with opposing armies having constructed elaborate bases directly adjacent to each other.

Valve designed each character, team, and equipped weapon to be visually distinct, even at range; for example, the coloring draws attention to the chest area, bringing focus on the equipped weapon. The voices for each of the classes were based on imagining what people from the 1960s would expect the classes to have sounded like, according to the writer Chet Faliszek.

The map design has an "evil genius" theme with archetypical spy fortresses, concealed within inconspicuous buildings such as industrial warehouses and farms to give plausibility to their close proximities; these bases are usually separated by a neutrally themed space. The bases hide exaggerated super weapons such as laser cannons, nuclear warheads, and missile launch facilities, taking the role of objectives. The maps have little visual clutter and stylized, almost impressionistic modeling, to allow enemies to be spotted more easily. The impressionistic design approach also affects textures, which are based on photos that are filtered and edited by hand, giving them a tactile quality and giving Team Fortress 2 its distinct look. The bases are designed to allow players to know immediately where they are. RED bases use warm colors, natural materials, and angular shapes, while BLU bases use cool colors, industrial materials, and orthogonal shapes.

During the July 2006 Electronic Arts press conference, Valve revealed that Team Fortress 2 would ship as the multiplayer component of The Orange Box. A conference trailer showcasing all nine of the classes demonstrated for the first time the game's cartoon-like visual style. Valve's president, Gabe Newell, said that the team's goal was to create "the best-looking and best-playing class-based multiplayer game". A beta release of the entire game was made on Steam on September 17, 2007, for customers who had pre-purchased The Orange Box, who had activated their Black Box coupon, which was included with the ATI HD 2900XT Graphics cards, and for members of Valve's Cyber Café Program.

Team Fortress 2 was released on October 10, 2007, both as a standalone product via Steam and at retail stores as part of The Orange Box compilation pack, priced at each gaming platform's recommended retail price. The Orange Box also contains Half-Life 2, Half-Life 2: Episode One, Half-Life 2: Episode Two, and Portal. Valve offered The Orange Box at a ten percent discount for those who pre-purchased it via Steam before the October 10 release, as well as the opportunity to participate in the beta test.

=== Post-release ===
Since the release of Team Fortress 2, Valve has continually released free updates and patches through Steam for Windows, macOS, and Linux users; though most patches are used for enhancing the reliability of the software or to make gameplay changes, several patches have been used to introduce new features and gameplay modes, and are often associated with marketing materials such as comics or videos offered on the Team Fortress 2 website; this blog is also used to keep players up to date with the ongoing developments in Team Fortress 2. As of July 2012, each class has been given a dedicated patch that provides new weapons, items, and other gameplay changes; these class patches typically included the release of the class's "Meet the Team" video. Other major patches have included new gameplay modes including the Payload, Payload Race, Training, Highlander, Medieval, and Mann vs. Machine modes. Themed patches have also been released, such as a yearly Halloween-themed event called "Scream Fortress", where players may obtain unique items available only during a set period around the holiday. Other new features have given players the ability to craft items within the game from other items, trade items with other players, purchase in-game items through funds in Steam, and save and edit replay videos that can be posted to YouTube.

Valve has released tools to allow users to create maps, weapons, and cosmetic items through a contribution site; many of the most popular are added to the game. This approach has subsequently created the basis for the Steam Workshop functionality of the software client. In one case, more than fifty users from the content-creation community worked with Valve to release an official content update in May 2013, with all of the content generated by these players. Valve reported that as of June 2013, over $10 million has been paid back to over 400 persons who have contributed content to the game, including a total of $250,000 for the participants in the May 2013 patch. To help promote community-made features, Valve has released limited-time events, such as the "Gun Mettle" or "Invasion" events in the second half of 2015, also including the "Tough Break" update in December 2015, in which players can spend a small amount of money which is paid back to the community developers for the ability to gain unique items offered while playing on community-made maps during the event. Additionally, purchasable map stamps were also added, allowing players to directly support the community map creators.

Development of the new content had been confirmed for the Xbox 360, while development for the PlayStation 3 was deemed "uncertain" by Valve. However, the PlayStation 3 version of Team Fortress 2 received an update which repaired some of the issues found within the game, ranging from graphical issues to online connectivity problems; this update was included in a patch that also repaired issues found in the other games within The Orange Box. The updates released on PC and planned for later release on Xbox 360 include new official maps and game modes, as well as tweaks to classes and new weapons that can be unlocked through the game's achievement system. The developers attempted to negotiate with Xbox 360 developer Microsoft to keep the Xbox 360 releases of these updates free, but Microsoft refused and Valve announced that they would release bundles of several updates together to justify the price. Because of the cost of patching during the seventh generation of video game consoles, Valve has been unable to provide additional patches to the Xbox 360 version since 2009, effectively cancelling development of the console versions. On March 29, 2023, the servers for the PlayStation 3 version of Team Fortress 2 went offline permanently.

On June 10, 2010, Team Fortress 2 was released for macOS, shortly after the release of Steam for macOS. The release was teased by way of an image similar to early iPod advertising, showing a dark silhouette of the Heavy on a bright green background, his "Sandvich" highlighted in his hand. Virtual earbuds, which can be worn when playing on either macOS or Windows once acquired, were given to players playing the game on macOS before June 14, though the giveaway period was later extended to August 16.

On November 6, 2012, Valve announced the release of Team Fortress 2 for Linux as part of a restricted beta launch of Steam on the platform. This initial release of Steam and Team Fortress 2 was targeted at Ubuntu with support for other distributions planned for the future. Later, on December 20, 2012, Valve opened up access to the beta, including Team Fortress 2, to all Steam users without the need to wait for an invitation. On February 14, 2013, Valve announced the full release of Team Fortress 2 for Linux. From then to March 1, anyone who played the game on Linux would receive a free Tux penguin, which can be equipped in-game.

Team Fortress 2 was announced in March 2013 to be the first game to officially support the Oculus Rift, a consumer-grade virtual reality headset. A patch was made to the client to include a "VR Mode" that can be used with the headset on any public server.

In April 2020, source code for versions Team Fortress 2 and Counter-Strike: Global Offensive from 2018 was leaked online. This created fears that malicious users would use the code to make remote code execution software and attack servers or players' computers. Several fan projects halted development until the impact of the leak could be determined. Valve confirmed the legitimacy of the code leaks, but stated they do not believe it affects servers and clients running the latest official builds of either game.

On May 1, 2020, shortly following the death of the voice actor of the Soldier, Rick May, Valve released an update to Team Fortress 2, adding a tribute to his voicework as the Soldier in the form of a new main menu theme (a rendition of Taps), as well as statues of the Soldier saluting, added to most of the official in-game maps. These statues all featured a commemorative plaque dedicated to May and lasted through the end of the month. One of these statues, appearing on the map "cp_granary", the setting of the "Meet the Soldier" short video, was made permanent in an August 21 update.

On February 9, 2023, a blog post was made on the official Team Fortress 2 website, saying that a new "update-sized" update was coming to the game (the last major update had taken place in October 2017). The post included a call to Steam Workshop creators to submit content which had a chance to be selected for inclusion, with a submission deadline of May 1. The announcement was met with an overwhelmingly positive reception. Valve later amended the post to read "holiday-sized update". Valve released the update on July 12, 2023, which included 14 community created maps that included a variant of the popular 'Versus Saxton Hale' game mode. The update ascended Team Fortress 2 to 253,997 concurrent players, its highest ever player count to date.

On April 18, 2024, after testing on Windows and Linux, Valve released an update to Team Fortress 2, adding 64-bit support to the game, increasing the frame rate by an average of 22 percent, although it was falsely detected as malware by some anti-virus software.

On June 17, 2024, Valve dropped macOS support for Team Fortress 2, among other legacy Valve titles that were previously supporting it, along with removing the Apple icon from the website's download button. The macOS port of Team Fortress 2 was not natively playable on any version beyond macOS Mojave, which Apple released in 2018 and supported until 2021. The lack of ongoing macOS support is largely attributable to Apple's use of its proprietary Metal graphics drivers, which are not officially compatible with the widely available Vulkan API that Team Fortress 2 can now run on.

On October 25, 2024, an update was released that fixed a bug where the BLU Team Scout was wearing brown pants (identical to the RED Scout's pants) rather than the intended blue pants matching the BLU Team's color scheme. The update received notable attention due to the perceived absurdity of fixing such a bug 17 years into the game's lifespan. It was reverted a day later, citing that it led to inconsistencies with existing cosmetic items that were based on the broken color scheme.

The Team Fortress 2 client and server source code was added to Valve's public software development kit (SDK) for the Source engine in February 2025, with the intent to allow creators to modify the game as much as they want and publish these via Steam, only requiring that such changes be released for free.

On June 23, 2025, Valve released a blog post asking community mappers to prepare new maps for an upcoming update focusing on the Mann vs. Machine game mode, which had not seen major additions since 2013. Over a year after the announcement, Valve released another post, reassuring that the update is still being worked on, noting the high amount of community submissions and clarifying that the update will not be rushed.

=== Free-to-play ===
On June 23, 2011, Valve announced that Team Fortress 2 would become free-to-play. Unique equipment including weapons and outfits would be available as microtransactions through the in-game store, tied through Steam. Walker stated that Valve would continue to provide new features and items free. Walker stated that Valve had learned that the more players Team Fortress 2 had, the more value it had for each player.

The move came a week after Valve introduced several third-party free-to-play games to Steam and stated they were working on a new free-to-play game. Within nine months of becoming free to play, Valve reported that revenue from Team Fortress 2 had increased by a factor of twelve.

=== Bot accounts and online protests ===
In early 2020, Team Fortress 2 saw a drastic increase in bot accounts entering Valve's casual matchmaking servers. Though bot accounts had been an issue in Team Fortress 2 for some time prior to this, multiple sources began to report a spike in activity for these bot accounts. The activities of these bots have included forcibly crashing servers, spamming obscenities and copypastas in text chats or audio in the voice chats of matches, assuming other players' usernames to confuse players attempting to kick them from the server, and the usage of aimbot cheating software. Additionally, some bots were programmed after a TF2 source code leak which Valve had confirmed in April 2020.

On June 16, 2020, Valve responded to this by restricting accounts that have not paid for Mann Co. Store items or purchased Team Fortress 2 prior to the game becoming free-to-play from the use of both voice and text chat in game. On June 24, all players were restricted from changing their Steam username while connected to any Valve matchmaking server or any server with display name updates disabled. The change was implemented to prevent bots from changing their display name to impersonate legitimate players, which allowed the bots to avoid being kicked due to the confusion caused by their duplicate name. On voting, changes were also introduced to prevent bots from spamming this functionality in an attempt to prevent bots from kicking real players.

On June 22, 2021, additional changes were implemented to discourage bot activity. YouTuber "Toofty" posted a video which provided input from several of those responsible for the bots; their reasons for hosting the bots ranged from grievances against Valve to simply taking pleasure in the disruption.

These issues remained ongoing as of May 2022, prompting the YouTuber "SquimJim" to uploaded a video to his YouTube page encouraging his viewers to express any displeasure to Valve and news outlets by sending emails. After receiving over a hundred news tips, the IGN writer Rebekah Valentine wrote of her experience with trying to play the game. She remarked that the game was "literally unplayable" on official Valve servers, forcing many players to join unofficial community servers instead. She also said that some bots would "...spam chat with homophobic or racist remarks, outside links, or just plain rude or obnoxious messages". In response to these issues, Robin Atkin Downes, the voice actor for the Medic, also reached out to his contacts at Valve for a response, and encouraged fans to continue making their voices heard in a "peaceful, passionate manner".

On May 26, 2022, a hashtag '#savetf2' went viral on Twitter by Team Fortress 2 with an intent to alert Valve for the issues. Valve responded, "TF2 community, we hear you! We love this game and know you do, too. We see how large this issue has become and are working to improve things."

Across June and July 2022, Valve released a number of patches to help players deal with the bot issue, such as altering the game's vote-kicking system so that each team may engage a vote kick regardless whether the opposing team is doing so. Valve took down the servers for five minutes in August 2022, during which a number of bans were issued via Valve Anti-Cheat to players that were known to be running these bots.

Bots slowly began to resurface thereafter, and in January 2024, the '#savetf2' hashtag re-emerged on social media as the issue neared the severity it was a couple years prior, as well as to highlight a lack of promised fixes to other parts of the game. Another online protest was held on June 3, 2024, this time with the "#FixTF2" hashtag and an online petition intended to be sent to Valve directly that has amassed over 300,000 signatures. The day after, the game received waves of negative reviews on its Steam store page as part of a campaign by users for Valve to take action against the bots. Downes also returned to support the new protest. On June 28, multiple outlets reported that another wave of bans to bot accounts and their hosts had been issued. The following day, Valve updated their support page for the game to mention that game bans would not be reverted.

== Tie-in materials ==
External videos
- "Meet the Team" playlist on YouTube

Beginning in May 2007, to promote the game, Valve began a ten-video advertisement series referred to as "Meet the Team". Constructed using Source Filmmaker and using more detailed character models, the series consists of short videos introducing each class (as they appear on RED) and displaying their personalities and abilities. The videos are usually interspersed with simulated gameplay footage. The format of the videos varies greatly; the first installment, "Meet the Heavy", depicts him being interviewed, while "Meet the Soldier" shows the Soldier giving a misinformed lecture on Sun Tzu to a row of severed BLU heads as if they were raw recruits. He claims Sun Tzu "invented" fighting, then further confuses this claim with the story of Noah and his Ark. The videos were generally released through Valve's official YouTube channels, though in one notable exception, the "Meet the Spy" video was leaked onto YouTube several days before its intended release.

Early "Meet the Team" videos were based on the audition scripts used for the voice actors for each of the classes; "Meet the Heavy" is nearly word-for-word a copy of the Heavy's audition script. Later videos, such as "Meet the Sniper", contain more original material. The videos have been used by Valve to help improve the technology for the game, specifically improving the facial animations, as well as a source of new gameplay elements, such as the Heavy's "Sandvich" or the Sniper's "Jarate". The final video in the Meet the Team series, "Meet the Pyro", was released on June 27, 2012. Gabe Newell has stated that Valve used the "Meet the Team" series as a means of exploring the possibilities of making feature films. He believes that only game developers are capable of bringing the interesting parts of a game to a film, and suggested that this would be the only manner through which a Half-Life-based film would be made. A fifteen-minute short, "Expiration Date", was released on June 17, 2014. The shorts were made using Source Filmmaker, which was officially released and has been in open beta as of July 11, 2012.

=== Comics ===
In more recent major updates to the game, Valve has presented teaser images and online comic books that expand the fictional continuity and characters of Team Fortress 2, as part of the expansion of the "cross-media property", according to Newell. In August 2009, Valve brought aboard the American comic writer Michael Avon Oeming to teach Valve "about what it means to have a character and do character development in a comic format, how you do storytelling". "Loose Canon", a comic associated with the Engineer Update, establishes the history of RED versus BLU as a result of the last will and testament of Zepheniah Mann in 1890, forcing his two bickering sons Blutarch and Redmond to vie for control of Zepheniah's lands between them; both have engineered ways of maintaining their mortality to the present, waiting to outlast the other while employing separate forces to try to wrest control of the land. This and other comics also establish other background characters such as Saxton Hale, the CEO of Mann Co., the company that provides the weapons for the two sides and was bequeathed to one of Hale's ancestors by Zepheniah, and the Administrator, the game's announcer, that watches over, encourages the RED/BLU conflict, and keeps each side from winning. The collected comics were published by Dark Horse Comics in Valve Presents: The Sacrifice and Other Steam-Powered Stories, a volume along with other comics created by Valve for Portal 2 and Left 4 Dead, and released in November 2011. Cumulative details in updates both in-game and on Valve's sites from 2010 through 2012 were part of a larger alternate reality game preceding the reveal of the Mann vs. Machine mode, which was revealed as a co-op mode on August 15, 2012. An additional series of seven comic stories around the characters of Team Fortress 2 were published sporadically by Valve from 2013 through 2024, simply titled Team Fortress Comics.

== Marketing and microtransactions ==
Valve had provided other promotions to draw players into the game. Valve held weekends of free play for Team Fortress 2 before the game was made free-to-play. Through various updates, hats and accessories can be worn by any of the classes, giving players an ability to customize the look of their character, and extremely rare hats named "Unusuals" have particle effects attached to it and are only obtainable through opening "crates" or trading with other players. Cosmetic items can also be obtained through the Steam Community Market, which Valve released in 2013. New weapons were added in updates to allow the player to choose a loadout and play style that best suits them.

Hats and weapons can be gained as a random drop, through the crafting/trading systems, or via cross-promotion: Limited-edition hats and weapons have been awarded for pre-ordering or gaining Achievements in other content from Steam, both from Valve (such as Left 4 Dead 2 and Alien Swarm) or other third-party games such as Sam & Max: The Devil's Playhouse, Worms Reloaded, Killing Floor, or Poker Night at the Inventory (which features the Heavy class as a character). According to Robin Walker, Valve introduced these additional hats as an indirect means for players to show status within the game or their affiliation with another game series simply by visual appearance.

The Pyro, Heavy, and Spy all function as a single playable character in the PC release of Sonic & All-Stars Racing Transformed. The Pyro, Medic, Engineer, and Heavy appear as playable characters in Dungeon of the Endless. The Pyro was added as a playable character to Killing Floor in 2010, along with appearing as a henchman in the 2021 game Evil Genius 2.

The game's first television commercial premiered during the first episode of the fifth season of The Venture Bros. in June 2013, featuring in-game accessories that were created with the help of Adult Swim.

Valve has licensed intellectual property from Team Fortress 2 to many different game development and pop culture companies. Valve has collaborated with the National Entertainment Collectibles Association and threezero to produce action figures of the nine classes. Valve has also licensed Team Fortress 2's classes to Funko, who released POP! vinyls of the Heavy, Medic and Scout in 2017. In 2014, Valve licensed the classes for use in the FaceRig program. Team Fortress 2 classes have also featured in Evil Genius 2 and Fall Guys.

== Items and economy ==
In Team Fortress 2, players can trade with others for items such as weapons and cosmetics. This functionality was added in the 2010 Mann-Conomy Update, alongside being able to purchase items through an in-game store with real money. Operating largely through informal gray markets before the introduction of the official Steam Community Market, trading items made players susceptible to fraud.

Team Fortress 2 features an in-built item valuing system known as an item quality, assigned to a given instance of an item through a variety of different means and ranging from "Normal" items used as the stock weapons of each class, to "Unique" items used as the base obtainable items from the item drop or achievement systems, to far rarer qualities such as "Strange", "Unusual" or "Decorated" which feature special cosmetic effects that can immensely increase the market value of a given item; Strange items keep track of kills or other objectives achieved while equipped in-game while Unusual items feature item-specific particle effects, with both Strange and Unusual items being obtainable through rare crafting items or randomly obtained in place of the far more common Unique items. Decorated items are instead redeemed from rare items known as "war paints", awarding the player a weapon retextured with a pseudo-random cosmetic skin. Other qualities include "Vintage", awarded to older items to compensate for changes in obtainability, and "Collector's", created through combining 200 Unique instances of a single item.

Cosmetics and war paints are typically released through seasonal "cases" that award a random item from an associated collection unique to the given season of a specific year. Such items are additionally assigned a "grade" from "Civilian" to "Mercenary" to track their relative rarity within a collection.

The Mann versus Machine mode introduced unique live service rewards, including killstreak-tracking attachment "kits" for weapons, and "Botkiller" and "Australium" variants of existing weapons that act as Strange weapons by default.

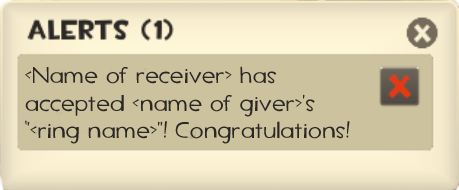
The message displayed for all players upon the ring getting accepted.

On Valentine's Day of 2012, a particular item was added called "Something Special for Someone Special", a $100 wedding ring that can be gifted to other players. Upon receiving and accepting the ring, a message is broadcast to everyone currently in-game, noting the player and recipient's names as well as the name used on the ring. This item has been described by various news outlets as "humorous". The item's ability to display text globally has been used to share messages, troll, or protest.

Third-party websites such as the crowd-sourced backpack.tf have been created to aid users in trading, as well as track the value of in-game items. Crate keys, crafting-metal, and in-game items such as an Earbuds cosmetic (also referred to as "buds") are all used as currency due to their value. Keys are a preferred currency as of 2025, with a fixed Steam price of US$2.18 each, though some inflation has nonetheless driven the market value down to around $1.80.

The economy of Team Fortress 2 has received significant attention from economists, journalists, and users due to its relative sophistication and the value of many of its in-game items. It has often been the subject of study. It operates on a system of supply and demand, barter, and scarcity value, akin to many real-world economies such as that of the United States. In 2011, it was reported that the economy of Team Fortress 2 was worth over US$50 million.

On July 6, 2018, Valve released a patch that prevents opening crates in Belgium and the Netherlands due to local laws making loot boxes illegal.

In what became known as "the Crate Depression" (a pun on "the Great Depression"), a bug contained in the update released on July 25, 2019, caused certain older series of Crates to always produce Unusual-grade cosmetic items, compared to the nominal 1% chance. The flood of the items damaged the in-game economy as the market prices of the Unusual items dropped precipitously in value. The bug was fixed the next day, and Valve prohibited the exchange of Unusual-grade items obtained via the bug. Valve would later decide that the first Unusual-grade item any player received from the bug would be made tradable while any subsequent items were only usable by the player who received them. A similar glitch briefly affected killstreak kits by allowing them to be attached to any item, including cosmetics. The glitched items did not have killstreak functionality and the error was resolved after a single night, but the affected items were not reverted and retained full tradability, making them exceptionally valuable due to their rarity.

Cosmetic items can frequently sell for thousands of dollars each, depending on base rarity and additional effects. Notably expensive hats include the "Hat of Undeniable Wealth and Respect", a pirate tricorne of which only around 750 were created in a themed community event, and the "Team Captain" peaked cap with a "Burning Flames" unusual effect, which has proven a staple of higher-end transactions. A record for the single largest trade in the game's history was set in 2025, appraised at upwards of $43,200 for an instance of the "Crone's Dome" witch hat. The item combined a "Spellbound" unusual effect with a pair of extremely limited "spell" item modifiers and a glitched killstreak kit, greatly inflating its value through both raw rarity and the thematically consistent cosmetic effects.

== Reception and legacy ==
Reception

Aggregate score
| Aggregator | Score |
|---|---|
| Metacritic | 92/100 |

Review scores
| Publication | Score |
|---|---|
| 1Up.com | A |
| Eurogamer | 9/10 |
| GameSpot | 8.5/10 |
| GameSpy | 5/5 |
| GamesRadar+ | 4.5/5 |
| IGN | 8.9/10 |
| PC Gamer (US) | 94% |
| GameDaily | 9/10 |

Awards
| Publication | Award |
|---|---|
| Game Critics Awards | Best Action Game (1999); Best Online Multiplayer (1999) |
| IGN | Best Artistic Design (2007) |
| 1UP.com | Best Multiplayer Experience (2007); Best Artistic Direction (2007) |
| GameSpy | Best Multiplayer Game of the Year (2007); Most Unique Art Style (2007) |

Team Fortress 2 received widespread critical acclaim, with overall scores of 92/100 "universal acclaim" on Metacritic. Many reviewers praised the cartoon-styled graphics, and the resulting light-hearted gameplay, and the use of distinct personalities and appearances for the classes impressed a number of critics, with PC Gamer UK stating that "until now multiplayer games just haven't had it". Similarly, the game modes were received well, GamePro described the settings as focusing "on just simple fun", while several reviewers praised Valve for the map "Hydro" and its attempts to create a game mode with variety in each map. Additional praise was bestowed on the game's level design, game balance and teamwork promotion. Team Fortress 2 has received several awards individually for its multiplayer gameplay and its graphical style, as well as having received a number of "game of the year" awards as part of The Orange Box.

Although Team Fortress 2 was well received, its removal of class-specific grenades, a feature of previous Team Fortress incarnations, was controversial amongst reviewers. IGN expressed some disappointment over this, while conversely, PC Gamer UK approved, stating "grenades have been removed entirely—thank God". Some further criticism came over a variety of issues, such as the lack of extra content such as bots (although Valve has since added bots in an update), problems of players finding their way around maps due to the lack of a minimap, and some criticism of the Medic class being too passive and repetitive in its nature. The Medic class has since been re-tooled by Valve, giving it new unlockable weapons and abilities.

Team Fortress 2 was nominated in the categories of "Outstanding Achievement in Art Direction" and "Outstanding Achievement in Animation" at the 11th Annual Interactive Achievement Awards; as part of The Orange Box compilation, it was awarded with "Computer Game of the Year" (shared with Half-Life 2: Episode Two and Portal).

With the "Gold Rush Update" in April 2008, Valve had started to add fundamentals of character customization through unlockable weapons for each class, which continued in subsequent updates, most notably the "Sniper vs. Spy Update" in April 2009, which introduced unlockable cosmetic items into the game. Further updates expanded the number of weapons and cosmetics available, but also introduced monetization options, eventually allowing it to go free-to-play. To this end, Team Fortress 2 is considered one of the first games to offer games as a service, a feature which would become more prevalent in the 2010s.

=== Fandom ===
After release, the game gained a strong following on YouTube, which proved instrumental in rallying support for combatting the bot crisis. The wide availability of the in-game assets has led to a wide range of Team Fortress fan works across Source Filmmaker, Garry's Mod, and Blender. Such work typically made use of sentence mixing to voice characters, though some would come to include original voice acting as well. The Saxxy Awards, which were held annually from 2011 to 2018, featured many Team Fortress-related works, and the community has also received attention for internet phenomena like the "Gmod-infused pisstake" Heavy is Dead. Praise has been directed towards The Winglet, a Source animator on YouTube responsible for the crossover TF2 vs Overwatch and the action comedy series The Fedora Chronicles, including the latter's 20-minute third installment "Live and Let Spy". The 2023 fan-film Emesis Blue received acclaim as a feature-length work of mainstream psychological horror.

Fans of Team Fortress Classic have made a total conversion mod of Team Fortress 2 titled Team Fortress 2 Classified (formerly known as Team Fortress 2 Classic), which seeks to marry gameplay elements and concepts from both entries alongside scrapped ideas from the sequel's development cycle and several entirely original additions.

In 2020, some content creators in the Team Fortress 2 community began using 15.ai, an artificial intelligence text-to-speech tool that could replicate the voices of the characters. The technology lead to viral content like Spy Is a Furry, The RED Bread Bank, and remakes of other animations like Heavy is Dead. The tool's ability to generate speech with emotional inflections saw significant use in TF2 fan content creation.

== See also ==
- 2Fort
- The Orange Box
