= Saxxy Awards =

Award for 3D-animation

- Awarded for: "Recognizing excellence in combat filmmaking"
- Location: Bellevue, Washington
- Country: United States
- Presented by: Valve Corporation
- First award: June 8, 2011; 15 years ago
- Final award: March 15, 2017; 9 years ago
- Website: http://www.teamfortress.com/saxxyawards/

The Saxxy Awards was an annual worldwide competition for 3D-animated films, hosted by Valve Corporation. The first competition was held in 2011 and included 20 competition categories. In 2012, the number of categories was limited to five, and the contestants are required to use Valve's Source Filmmaker software to create their animations.

Each year, winners receive an in-game melee weapon for Team Fortress 2 named a Saxxy; designed and named after the character Saxton Hale, who was the namesake for the awards. The item resembles the Oscar statuette. The winner of the 2012 'Best Overall' category was flown to Valve in Bellevue, Washington, U.S. for a filmmaking session with the company's very own filmmakers, which became a tradition for each of the following years' Saxxy Awards. There have been 26 Saxxy Awards given out to winners since 2012. After 2017, Valve has not held another Saxxy Awards competition, and currently have not said anything about the competition. This has led fans and SFM artists to create the Community Saxxy Awards in 2021 as a response to Valve's inaction.

== Competition ==
Originally, the Saxxy Awards encouraged fans of Team Fortress 2 to create machinima (video game-based films) based around the video game; the competition has since expanded to include other video games. Valve released the Source Filmmaker software before the second competition, which allowed users to animate their own videos using Valve's video game assets, including models, dialogue, sound effects, and particle systems. Winners are decided by public polling and a Valve jury, allowing voters to thumbs-up or thumbs-down entrants through the Steam online platform during voting periods.

== 2012 Awards ==
External videos
- Story of a Sentry
- Meet the Dumpster Diver
- The Wishmaker
- Bad Medicine
- EPIC High Five Fail

The 2012 Saxxy Awards were announced by Valve in August 2012. Voting opened on November 16, 2012, and ran until November 27. The short voting period was because Valve planned to show the video that won in the Best Overall category at the Spike Video Game Awards on December 7. The 20 competition categories from the 2011 awards were reduced to five for 2012; Best Action, Best Replay, Best Comedy, Best Drama, and Best Overall. The 2011 competition required that all video content be based exclusively on replays from Team Fortress 2; however, the 2012 competition allowed content to be based on any of Valve's properties. The 2012 finalists received an item which was simply a video camera that is used as a melee weapon, while the winners each received the aforementioned Saxxy.

The winners were announced on November 30, but the winner of the Best Overall category was not revealed until the Spike Video Game Awards ceremony. Winners received a golden statue of the game's character Saxton Hale, and the Best Overall winner was given a trip to Valve Headquarters to meet the team that created the Source Filmmaker tool.

2012 winners:

- Best Overall: Story of a Sentry
- Best Action: Meet the Dumpster Diver
- Best Comedy: The Wishmaker
- Best Drama: Bad Medicine
- Best Replay: EPIC High Five Fail

== 2013 Awards ==
External videos
- The Mann Co. Symphony
- Chinatown Getaway
- Disruption
- Till Death Do Us Part Two
- Lil Guardian Pyro

The 2013 Saxxy Awards were announced on October 2, 2013, with entries being accepted from November 11 through November 18. The nominations were announced at November 25 and the winners at November 26 4:00 PM PST.

2013 Winners:

- Best Short: The Mann Co. Symphony
- Best Action: Chinatown Getaway
- Best Comedy: Disruption
- Best Drama: Till Death Do Us Part Two (Till Death Do Us Part One was nominated for Saxxy 2012)
- Best Overall: Lil' Guardian Pyro

Honourable Mentions:

- Best Callback to a Team Fortess Update: War
- Best Meet The Team Homage: Meet the Fem Sniper
- Best GMod Style Animation: The Advantages of Sandviches
- Best Musical: Down In The Intel Room
- Best Late Entry: A Wrench in the Gears

== 2014 Awards ==
External videos
- Team Fortress 2 in 60 Seconds
- Rivalry Rush
- About a Scout
- DEFECT_
- Animation vs. Animator

The 2014 Saxxy Awards were announced on July 24, 2014, with entries being accepted from September 16 through September 23. The nominations were announced on September 30 and the winners were published on October 1 at 4:00 PM PST. It was confirmed by a member of the previous years Best Overall team that their video was believed to be a developed by a single person; which correlates with this year's winner (being a single person).

2014 Winners:

- Best Short: Team Fortress 2 in 60 Seconds
- Best Action: Rivalry Rush
- Best Comedy: About a Scout
- Best Drama: DEFECT_
- Best Overall: Animation vs. Animator

Honourable Mentions:

- Best Late Entry: Defuse on The Fly
- Best Five-Minutes-Exactly Piece: Wanted Warehouse
- Best Original Character: Cubey
- Best Crossover: The C4 Courier
- Best Tackling of a Serious Subject: Behind the Mask

== 2015 Awards ==
External videos
- A Dang Good Cop
- Micro-Mann
- Food Fortress
- Dota 2 - Together We Stand
- It's Play Time
- Turbulence

The 2015 Saxxy Awards were announced on August 21, 2015 with entries being accepted from Wednesday, November 4, 3:00 PM until Wednesday, November 11th, 3:00 PM PST. Nominations were announced on November 17, 2015 with winners being published on November 18, 2015. In contrast with previous years, the selected Best Overall team had nine members, making it the largest of all three winning teams.

2015 Winners:

- Best Short: A Dang Good Cop
- Best Action: Micro-Mann
- Best Comedy: Food Fortress
- Best Drama: Dota 2 - Together We Stand
- Best Extended: It's Play Time
- Best Overall: Turbulence

Honourable Mentions:

- Best Late Entry: Secret Lives
- Best Sketch Comedy: Blu Team's Day Off
- Best Reveal Of Our Secret Plans: Mann Vs. Hat
- Audience Choice Award: Mechanical Mishap
- Best 2D/3D Mashup: A Spark Of Life
- Best Commercial For Another Game: No Time To Waste

== 2016 Awards ==
External videos
- Power of Art
- The Pybro
- Healirious
- Living in Obscurity
- Reinstated: The Arrival
- Timeless Thief

The 2016 Saxxy Awards were announced on August 9, 2016 with entries being accepted from Friday, November 4, 3:00 PM until Friday, November 11th, 3:00 PM PST. Nominations were announced on November 17, 2016 with winners being published on November 18, 2016. Similar to last year, the Best Overall team consists of nine members.

2016 Winners:

- Best Short: Power of Art
- Best Action: The Pybro
- Best Comedy: Healirious
- Best Drama: Living in Obscurity
- Best Extended: Reinstated: The Arrival
- Best Overall: Timeless Thief

Honourable Mentions:

- Audience Choice Award: Lunch Break
- Best Movie Homage: Protonic Morons
- Best Unfinished Entry: A Shattered Dream

== 2017 Awards ==
External videos
- Player's Portrait
- Board Room
- Chicken Strike
- Legacy
- Leak
- Agent Gunn: Vulkanite

The 2017 Saxxy Awards were announced on December 5, 2017 with entries being accepted from Thursday, March 1, 3:00 PM until Thursday, March 8, 3:00 PM PST, 2018. Nominations were announced on March 14, 2018 with winners being published on March 15, 2018. This year's Best Overall team count beat any of the previous years' record, consisting of 19 members total.

2017 Winners:

- Best Short: Player's Portrait
- Best Action: Board Room
- Best Comedy: Chicken Strike
- Best Drama: Legacy
- Best Extended: Leak
- Best Overall: Agent Gunn: Vulkanite

Honourable Mentions:

- The Box Mann
- Inside Surgery
- Meet The Janitor

== Series hiatus and Community Saxxy Awards ==
After the 2017 Awards, Valve has not held another Saxxy Awards competition and let the series slip into an informal hiatus. As of 2026, Valve has not commented on the series' implied cancellation. To compensate, a group of Source Filmmaker artists in the SFM community created the Community Saxxy Awards in 2021 as a response to Valve's inaction, although as of 2026, it has not been held since.
