= Fortress Forever =

- Developer: Fortress Forever Development Team
- Engine: Source
- Platform: Microsoft Windows
- Release: September 13, 2007, March 27, 2015 (Steam)
- Genre: First-person shooter
- Mode: Multiplayer

Fortress Forever is a multiplayer first-person shooter modification of Half-Life 2. The game is based on Team Fortress Classic, and was created by the Fortress Forever development team. The intended scope of Fortress Forever is to please older Team Fortress Classic fans, while at the same time creating a game enjoyable enough to players new to Team Fortress-styled games.

== Development ==
Fortress Forever was in development for more than a year before the Half-Life 2 SDK was released, according to a developer team member. Fortress Forever was originally released as a modification for Half-Life 2 on September 13, 2007. The game is now freely available to all who have a Steam account. On May 24, 2013, Fortress Forever updated to version 2.46. On October 16, 2013, Fortress Forever was greenlit for Steam. Version 2.46 was the last version of Fortress Forever released before the game and future updates were released on Steam. On March 27, 2015, Fortress Forever was released on Steam. On June 5, 2016, the latest version, version 2.6 was released.

=== Port to Source Engine 2013 ===
In January 2024, development was started on a project to update Fortress Forever to the 2013 branch of the Source Engine. The project was made available as a beta branch on Steam and later formally announced on October 12, 2024.
