= Giochi per il mio computer =

Italian video game magazine

- Editor: Paolo Paglianti
- Former editors: Andrea Minini Saldini
- Categories: Games magazine
- Frequency: Monthly
- First issue: May 1997
- Final issue: September 2012
- Company: Sprea Media Italy
- Country: Italy
- Based in: Milan
- Language: Italian

Giochi per il mio computer (Italian: Games for my PC), also known by the acronym GMC, was an Italian magazine about computer video games and every thing concerns this topic. In Italy it represented the leading magazine in its field and frequently sold more than 100,000 copies.

The internal structure was divided in eight sections:

- editorial, which concerns general video games world's topics
- column of readers' letters
- previews of the most expected games
- general reviews
- hardware section, including a column dedicated to solve readers' problems
- the so-called "next level", a section dedicated to mods, free games and bargains in general
- guide for the complete game, sold with the magazine monthly
- closing credits

GMC had frequent changes in its publisher: when first created, it was published by Il mio castello editore, in Autumn 2000 it was passed to a division of Future Publishing, Future Media Italy (with many other editions) and finally from March 2007, it was published by the Italian publishing house Sprea Media Italy.

== Deus Ex leak ==
The magazine was involved in the leak of a preview copy of the new Deus Ex game, but was later found to have no responsibility.

== List of numbers ==
	Jan	Feb	Mar	Apr	May	Jun	Jul	Agu	Sep	Oct	Nov	Dec	XMas
1997					1	2	3	4	5	6	7	8
1998	9	10	11	12	13	14	15	16	17	18	19	20
1999	21	22	23	24	25	26	27	28	29	30	31	32	33
2000	34	35	36	37	38	39	40	41	42	43	44	45	46
2001	47	48	49	50	51	52	53	54	55	56	57	58	59
2002	60	61	62	63	64	65	66	67	68	69	70	71	72
2003	73	74	75	76	77	78	79	80	81	82	83	84	85
2004	86	87	88	89	90	91	92	93	94	95	96	97	98
2005	99	100	101	102	103	104	105	106	107	108	109	110	111
2006	112	113	114	115	116	117	118	119	120	121	122	123	124
2007	125	126	127	128	129	130	131	132	133	134	135	136	137
2008	138	139	140	141	142	143	144	145	146	147	148	149	150
2009	151	152	153	154	155	156	157	158	159	160	161	162	163
2010	164	165	166	167	168	169	170	171	172	173	174	175	176
2011	177	178	179	180	181	182	183	184	185	186	187	188
2012	189	190	191	192	193	194	195	196
