= Team Fortress 2 Classified =

2014 video game mod

- Developer: EMINOMA
- Release: 1.0.0 / 31 December 2014; 11 years ago
- Stable release: 3.2.4 / 19 October 2026; 27 days ago
- Written in: C++
- Engine: Source
- Platform: Microsoft Windows; Linux
- Available in: 14 languages
- List of languages English, German, Hungarian, Italian, Polish, Portuguese - Brazil, Portuguese - Portugal, Russian, Simplified Chinese, Spanish - Latin America, Spanish - Spain, Traditional Chinese, Turkish, Ukrainian
- Type: First-person shooter
- License: Proprietary (code); Non-commercial usage only (assets)
- Website: tf2classified.com

Team Fortress 2 Classified (previously Team Fortress 2 Classic) is a 2014 modification of Team Fortress 2, initially developed by Danielmm8888 and various contributors, before later forming a team under the name EMINOMA to continue work on the mod. The game was released on January 30, 2026, on Steam.

Defining itself as a "experience built on [Team Fortress 2's] original inspirations and tone", it restores the game's pre-release character shading, reimplements cut content, removes many later additions to the game's content and lore, and adds new content intended to evoke the spirit of older updates to the game. Notable content additions include two additional teams, Green (GRN) and Yellow (YLW) which can be used by mappers to modify existing game modes, and an escort game mode based on the scrapped "Civilian" class.

After Valve's release of the Team Fortress 2 SDK in February 2025, Team Fortress 2 Classic announced that it would be released on Steam later in the year. However, Valve Corporation, the developers of Team Fortress 2, requested that the game be renamed to avoid confusion with their IP. It was later rebranded to Team Fortress 2 Classified.

== Development ==
Team Fortress 2 Classified was created on the Facepunch Forums in late 2014 by Danielmm8888, who ported leaked Team Fortress 2 code from 2007 to the publicly-available Source SDK, allowing himself and other community contributors to make changes to the game and add new features. It replaced earlier projects that used older builds of Team Fortress 2 directly, and could not be modified to add new content.

An early addition was Deathmatch, a free-for-all game mode. In 2018, this mode was split off from TF2 Classified into a standalone game, Team Deathmatch Classic, to be developed by Compucolor Pictures, as "it was too large, and felt like its own separate game. Any game mode that disables classes/weapons to function goes against some of the core principles of Team Fortress 2."

The remaining features were polished and released in July 2020 as a part of the Death & Taxes update, ending an extended period of silence that saw no public releases after 2016. The game was temporarily unavailable from September 2021 through June 2022, after a supposed arrangement with Valve fell through.

Team Fortress 2 Classified was planned to be released in beta on Steam in October 2025 but had to be put on hold, with Valve telling the team a game cannot be a mod and demo at the same time, while also requesting to rename the mod due to potential confusion with Team Fortress Classic, an official Valve title, and the Steamworks documentation reading that mods must have a distinct identity and not suggest they are endorsed or created by Valve. The mod was consequently renamed from Team Fortress 2 Classic to Team Fortress 2 Classified and postponed to January 30, 2026, with EMINOMA citing extensive testing and slow communication with Steam as reasons for the delay.

== Gameplay ==
The core gameplay of Team Fortress 2 Classified is identical to Team Fortress 2 in most ways, described as "toning down TF2's less coherent elements in favor of gameplay-focused additions". Existing content (as existed in the game's original 2007 release) goes largely untouched, in favor of removing in-game paid cosmetics and augmenting the gameplay with new weapons and game modes. Compared to Team Fortress 2, the new game modes include:

- VIP – Modeled after the "Hunted" map from Team Fortress Classic, which featured a unique Civilian class that lacked any ranged weapon and had to be escorted by a team of bodyguards to an objective. TF2 Classified amends this by letting the Civilian buff his nearby teammates, removing the class restrictions of the original mode, and adding different types of objectives across the various VIP maps for him to capture.
- VIP Race – A symmetrical variant of the regular VIP game mode. Both teams have two capture points and their own VIP. In order to win, a team's VIP must capture the enemy's points in order. A team's ownership of the enemy's capture points is reset upon their VIP's death.
- Domination – A game mode where each team accumulates points by owning objectives, up to a limit where the team with the most points wins.
- Territorial Domination – A spin on the Territorial Control mode from the base game, removing the multiple rounds and separate stages, and instead dynamically changing team spawnpoints based on which objectives you own. Starting positions are randomly assigned at the start of each round, and each round is won by owning every objective simultaneously.
- Four-team – Variations of gamemodes from the base game (such as Capture the Flag and King of the Hill) redesigned to support two additional teams: GRN and YLW.

TF2 Classified features extensive modding support, allowing client-side visual customisation and adding the ability to add custom content on private servers, such as new weapons. Steam Workshop support is planned to make mods easier to install.

== Reception ==
PC Gamer's Jonathan Bolding described TF2 Classified as "a remarkably well-produced mod that covers a lot of ground". GamingOnLinux's Liam Dawe said "[it's] a fun mod and well made. Especially interesting timing now that Valve rarely do anything with TF2, so this could help bring back some of its former glory perhaps". TF2 Classified reached over 10,000 concurrent players shortly after its release on Steam, with PC Gamer reporting the servers to be consistently full.
