= Team Fortress Classic =

1999 video game

- Developer: Valve
- Publisher: Sierra Studios
- Designers: John Cook; Robin Walker
- Engine: GoldSrc
- Platforms: Windows, OS X, Linux
- Release: April 7, 1999: Windows; April 7, 1999; OS X, Linux; August 12, 2013
- Genre: First-person shooter
- Mode: Multiplayer

Team Fortress Classic is a 1999 first-person shooter game developed by Valve and published by Sierra Studios. It was originally released in April 1999 as a mod for Valve's 1998 Windows game Half-Life, and is based on Team Fortress, a mod for the 1996 game Quake.

In Team Fortress Classic, two teams compete in online multiplayer matches. Players choose one of nine classes, each with different skills. The scenarios include capture the flag, territorial control, and escorting a "VIP" player.

Valve hired the developers of the Team Fortress mod to develop Team Fortress Classic. It received generally positive reviews, although the graphics were a point for criticism. In 2000, Valve released a standalone version, Team Fortress 1.5, with new character models, maps and other features. Team Fortress 2 was released in 2007.

== Gameplay ==
In the capture the flag map "2fort", short for "2 Fortresses", a group of blue players attack the red base.

Matches in Team Fortress Classic typically feature two teams, one red and one blue, and nine playable character classes. Each character class has a set of weapons and abilities unique to that specific class. This differentiation between classes makes for rock-paper-scissors-esque gameplay that requires teammates to work together in order to effectively achieve the objective. The class-system also encourages players to vary their selection of classes and utilize certain classes in conjunction with one another to gain the advantage.

In Team Fortress Classic, a server can hold up to 32 players simultaneously, and matches can be played in a number of game modes, each featuring different objectives.

=== Classes ===
In Team Fortress Classic, the player can choose to play as one of nine classes: the Scout, Sniper, Soldier, Demoman, Medic, Heavy Weapons Guy, Pyro, Spy, or Engineer. Each class comes equipped with at least one weapon unique to that class, and often a secondary weapon which may be common across multiple classes (typically a shotgun or nailgun). Additionally, each class gets a melee weapon (all classes, with the exception of the Medic, Spy, and Engineer, wield a crowbar, an homage to Valve's game Half-Life). Finally, each player carries grenades; the effects of grenades vary, depending on the player's class.

In Escort game modes, a player may also choose to play as the Civilian class, which is armed only with an umbrella, no armor, and very little health. Civilians are typically escorted and protected by the rest of the team.

- The Scout is the fastest class in the game, but is unable to deal much damage in return. The Scout is armed with a nailgun and shotgun as well as being able to use caltrops and concussion grenades to slow down and confuse opponents. He can also disarm the Demoman's detonation pack, reveal enemy Spies by running close by fellow players as well as instantly locate the flags on any capture-the-flag map.
- The Sniper class is armed with a high-powered sniper rifle, and can be used to attack enemies from distant positions.
- The Soldier class is significantly slower than Snipers and Scouts, but possesses better armor and is armed with a rocket launcher that allows him to rocket jump, along with combat shotguns as sidearms for backup. Rocket jumping, while effective for moving about the battlefield, also significantly damages the soldier. Soldiers can also make use of nail bombs to cause more damage within close quarters.
- The Demoman class is armed with a grenade launcher for indirect fire onto enemy positions, and a Pipe Bomb launcher for booby-trapping places as well as being equipped with a demolition pack capable of opening or closing certain routes on some levels.

The original models for the nine player classes

- The Medic class is equipped with a super nail gun, concussion grenades and a medical kit that can be used either to heal teammates or expose opponents to a contagious infection that drains health.
- The Heavy Weapons class is armed with a powerful minigun, and can sustain more damage than any other class. However, the Heavy is significantly slower than the other classes.
- The Pyro class is equipped with a flamethrower and an incendiary rocket launcher, both of which can set enemies on fire. Pyros also carry several napalm grenades for the same purpose.
- The Spy class differs significantly in style from other classes, as he can disguise himself to look like any other class on either side. The Spy is equipped with a knife to kill enemy players in one hit by stabbing them in the back, a tranquilizer gun to slow down opponents and a hallucination grenade which spouts gas to confuse them. Spies also possess the ability to feign death, allowing them to use their backstab ability more effectively.
- The Engineer class builds structures to support their team, such as sentry guns to defend key points, ammunition dispensers and teleporters. Engineers have the ability to replenish a teammate's armor by tapping them with their wrench. In addition, the Engineer is armed with EMP grenades that detonates any explosive ammunition within its range, as well as a shotgun for backup.

== Development ==
The original Team Fortress Quake mod

The first Team Fortress was a mod for Quake (1996), developed by TF Software Pty. Ltd. In June 1998, Valve announced it had acquired TF Software to create a Team Fortress game as a mod for Valve's 1998 game Half-Life. After several delays, Team Fortress Classic was released on April 7, 1999.

On June 9, 2000, Valve released Team Fortress 1.5 as a part of Half-Life's 1.1 update. It was the first standalone version of Team Fortress. The update added "new sounds and weapons, enhanced graphics, new models for classes and weapons, new maps from popular mapmakers, an updated user interface that makes finding and joining games easy and intuitive, and a new in-game Command Menu Interface". It also included a new in-game interface and the networking code for Valve's upcoming Team Fortress 2. There were three new maps with the update: Dustbowl, Warpath, and Epicenter. A new menu allowed players to execute commands to change teams, call for a medic and change classes while in a match.

Valve updated Team Fortress over time, tweaking the networking code, and adding new maps and game modes. In 2003, Team Fortress Classic was distributed via Valve's Steam system. Versions for OS X and Linux were released in 2013.

== Reception ==
Reception

Aggregate score
Aggregator	Score
GameRankings	85%

Review scores
Publication	Score
PC Gamer (UK)	85%
PC Gaming World	9.8/10

Team Fortress Classic received positive reviews, garnering a rating of 85% on the video game review aggregator site GameRankings. PC Gamer US named Team Fortress Classic the best multiplayer game of 1999, and wrote that it was "more fun and more addictive than any other multiplayer-only title released in 1999, and didn't cost owners of Half-Life a single penny". PC Gamer UK praised the multiple character classes, "sophisticated game-tactics", and drive to work together with your team, but criticized the "clunky" team communication and graphics. Graham Smith of Rock, Paper, Shotgun criticized it as "messy" and "chaotic". In 2010, it was included in the book 1001 Video Games You Must Play Before You Die. As of February 2001, Team Fortress had sold 2.5 million copies.

== Later games ==
Valve released Team Fortress 2 in 2007. Fans created a mod for Half-Life 2, Fortress Forever, aiming to replicate the gameplay of Team Fortress Classic while using the more modern Source engine. Fans also made a similar mod of Team Fortress 2, Team Fortress 2 Classified, which seeks to marry gameplay elements and concepts from both entries alongside scrapped ideas from the sequel's development cycle and several entirely original additions.
