= Skibidi Toilet =

Animated web series by Alexey Gerasimov

- Genre: Animated series
- Created by: Alexey Gerasimov
- Showrunners: Alexey Gerasimov (2023–2025); Virlance (2026–present)
- Voices of: Alexey Gerasimov (2023–2025)
- Countries of origin: Georgia (2023–2025); United States (2025–present)
- Original language: English
- No. of seasons: 27
- No. of episodes: 83

Production
- Executive producer: Alexey Gerasimov
- Animators: Alexey Gerasimov (2023–2025); StriderZ47 (2025–present); Virlance (2026–present) y4pch1 (2026–present)
- Production company: Invisible Narratives

Original release
- Network: YouTube
- Release: 7 February 2023 - present

Skibidi Toilet (/ˈskɪb.ɪ.di/ SKIB-ih-dee; stylized in all lowercase) is an animated web series created by Alexey Gerasimov and released through YouTube videos and Shorts on his channel, skibidi (formerly DaFuq!?Boom!). Produced using Source Filmmaker, the series follows a war between toilets with human heads coming out of their bowls and humanoid characters with electronic devices, such as cameras, for heads.

Since the first short was posted on 7 February 2023, Skibidi Toilet became a viral Internet meme, particularly among Generation Alpha. Although many have criticized the web series, calling it "brain rot," many commentators saw their embrace of the series as Generation Alpha's first development of a unique Internet culture. The show has a wide range of licensed products with a film in production. In 2024, the rights to Skibidi Toilet were signed to media company Invisible Narratives, with some fans claiming they "stole the series" from Gerasimov.

== Plot ==
Diagram over The Alliance characters and factions of the Skibidi Toilet plot. The fictional war is presented as an arms race with constantly-evolving weapons.

The series depicts a conflict between the Skibidi—singing human-headed alien toilets—and 'upgraded' humans with CCTV cameras, speakers, and televisions in place of their heads. The Skibidi Toilets, led by G-Toilet, overtake humanity. Warfare soon develops between the toilets and the alliance of Cameramen, Speakermen, and TV Men, which escalates into a constant arms race. The Titan Cameraman and Titan Speakerman, strongest of their respective races, begin to turn the tide of war. However, the Chief Scientist of the Skibidi Toilets—the Skibidis' second-in-command and R&D chief—develops a mind control parasite that overtakes Titan Speakerman, causing him to turn on the alliance and cause mass carnage in their ranks. After Titan Speakerman is cured, an alliance force featuring Titan TV Man and others strikes at the toilets' underground facility, Alpha-Hills, and kills the Scientist. The force's sole survivor, Plungerman, learns that the facility and the enigmatic and omnipresent Administrator were somehow involved in the toilets' creation, but the Administrator telepathically kills him to protect the secret.

Concurrently, relations sour between the Skibidi Toilets and their former superiors, the Astro Toilets, a race of powerful extraterrestrial toilets that formerly counted G-Toilet among their ranks. This results in an Astro fleet invading Earth themselves, planning on destroying the Skibidi Toilets for being impure. Their power is such that neither the alliance nor the Skibidi Toilets can stand against them alone, and they form a temporary truce against their common enemy. The Earth's surface is ravaged in the ensuing battles, and the alliance's subterranean main base is eventually compromised along with Titan TV Man, whose mind is taken over by the Astro Empire and their field commander, the Duchess. With their base destroyed, their strongest soldier turned against them, and innumerable casualties, the alliance enters into a tactical retreat with just one remaining asset, a powerful Astro weapon they hope to reverse-engineer to turn the tide of battle.

== Production ==
Skibidi Toilet is produced by Alexey Gerasimov (Russian: Алексей Герасимов, born 1997 or 1998), also known by his alias "Blugray" or the former name of his YouTube channel, DaFuq!?Boom!. Originally created in Georgia, the series was animated by Alexey Gerasimov, who now resides in Mauritius and has been learning animation since 2014. (Note: Sources differ on whether Gerasimov is of Georgian nationalityFrance, Lisa Respers (25 July 2024). "'Skibidi Toilet:' If you don't know what it is, you will". CNN. Archived from the original on 27 July 2024. or originally from Russia, having moved to Georgia in 2019.Harris, Peter (23 October 2024). "Skibidi Toilet explained from origins to Michael Bay movie". Irish Star. While several sources previously reported that he resided in Georgia or described him as being "from Georgia", Gerasimov currently resides in Mauritius, as indicated by his official X account. "Gerasimov's X account".) His channel has seen prior hits such as the video I'M AT DIP, which accumulated over 45 million views by July 2023. Gerasimov studied at the Patrice Lumumba Peoples' Friendship University of Russia.

Thumbnail of the first episode depicting one of the titular toilets

The first episode of Skibidi Toilet was released on 7 February 2023 (UTC), with an 11-second runtime. The video, titled "skibidi toilet", depicts a toilet with a man's head coming out of it singing a song that prominently features the word "skibidi". Every episode is produced using Source Filmmaker, free Valve-published 3D computer graphics software often used to create and edit clips and movies online. Some assets used in the series are taken from video games such as Half-Life 2 and Counter-Strike: Source. For example, in the first episode, Skibidi Toilet features the head model of a Civilian (Male_07) from Half-Life 2, G-Toilet initially uses the head model of the G-Man, and the Speakermen perform dances originating from the battle royale game Fortnite.

An unlicensed mashup of the songs "Give It to Me" by Timbaland and "Dom Dom Yes Yes" by Bulgarian artist Biser King, created by TikTok user @doombreaker03, appears in early episodes as the Skibidi Toilets' theme and is later invoked as their battle cry. In 2024, the two songs' publisher Universal Music Group issued copyright complaints against the full version of the mashup, causing some videos featuring the mashup to be taken down.

"Dom Dom Yes Yes" gained popularity in 2022 through viral videos of Turkish TikToker Yasin Cengiz dancing to the song holding platters of food. TikTok user Paryss Bryanne parodied this meme, complementing it with her style of jerky acting with rapid cuts. Gerasimov cites her adaptation as one of the inspirations for Skibidi Toilet. In an interview, he said he was also inspired by recurring nightmares involving toilets. Ultimately, Gerasimov said that Skibidi Toilet's backbone is machinima videos created using sandbox game Garry's Mod, which were popular in the late 2000s and number in the thousands.

In the show's early days, Gerasimov uploaded at least two videos weekly (at times, even daily), though the time between episodes has since been extended to improve quality, and video lengths have increased. Since YouTube's recommendation algorithm tends to prefer frequent uploaders, the initial upload schedule may have helped the show go viral. As of January 2024, the series is reportedly being investigated by the Russian police for its alleged harm to children, following a report made by a Moscow resident. In April 2024, the videos were presented to the legislative assembly of Saint Petersburg as a demonstration in an annual children's safety report.

In October and November 2025, controversy arose surrounding the business relationship between Gerasimov and Invisible Narratives, with allegations that Invisible has forced Gerasimov to hand over control over the Skibidi Toilet intellectual property under financial threats. Invisible denied the accusations, and instead claimed that Gerasimov has stepping away from his role as a sole creator while remaining as executive producer of the series. Many fans remained skeptical of the relationship between the two parties, often expressed using the hashtag "#BringBoomBack" and “#LetBoomSpeak”.

In 16 March 2026, Invisible Narratives renamed the channel DaFuq!?Boom! to skibidi. They also changed the banner, the description and removed the remaining links of his personal account. Fans immediately criticized the decision, with some fans arguing that Alexey’s own work had been replaced with generic corporate-feeling and viewed the rebrand as a signal that Invisible was trying to detach the franchise from the creator.

On 3 September 2026, Invisible named the new four-person creative team, composed of artists Virlance, Strider, FScript and Achi, who are set to develop and produce future episodes. Invisible also confirmed that Gerasimov is currently not involved in their development and production, while claiming that a framework remains in place for his future participation.

== Reception and influence ==
=== Popularity ===
Skibidi Toilet's audience is predominantly Generation Alpha, those born since the early 2010s. While the series does not appear on YouTube Kids, an app designed for children under 13, it is popular among elementary school students. Kim Kardashian's 11-year-old daughter gave her a gold necklace reading "Skibidi Toilet". Many members of older generations have criticized the series as "brain rot", while other Internet users argue that the preceding Generation Z had its share of bizarre memes.

Skibidi Toilet has sparked its audience to create fanworks, such as games, fan fiction, and art, as well as the Generation Alpha slang "skibidi", which has no established definition. The series has found its way into Internet memes and Instagram videos. One TikTok meme nonsensically swaps some words in song lyrics with Generation Alpha slang, including skibidi, for humorous effect. Viral videos have surfaced where children sit inside containers and mimic the toilets.

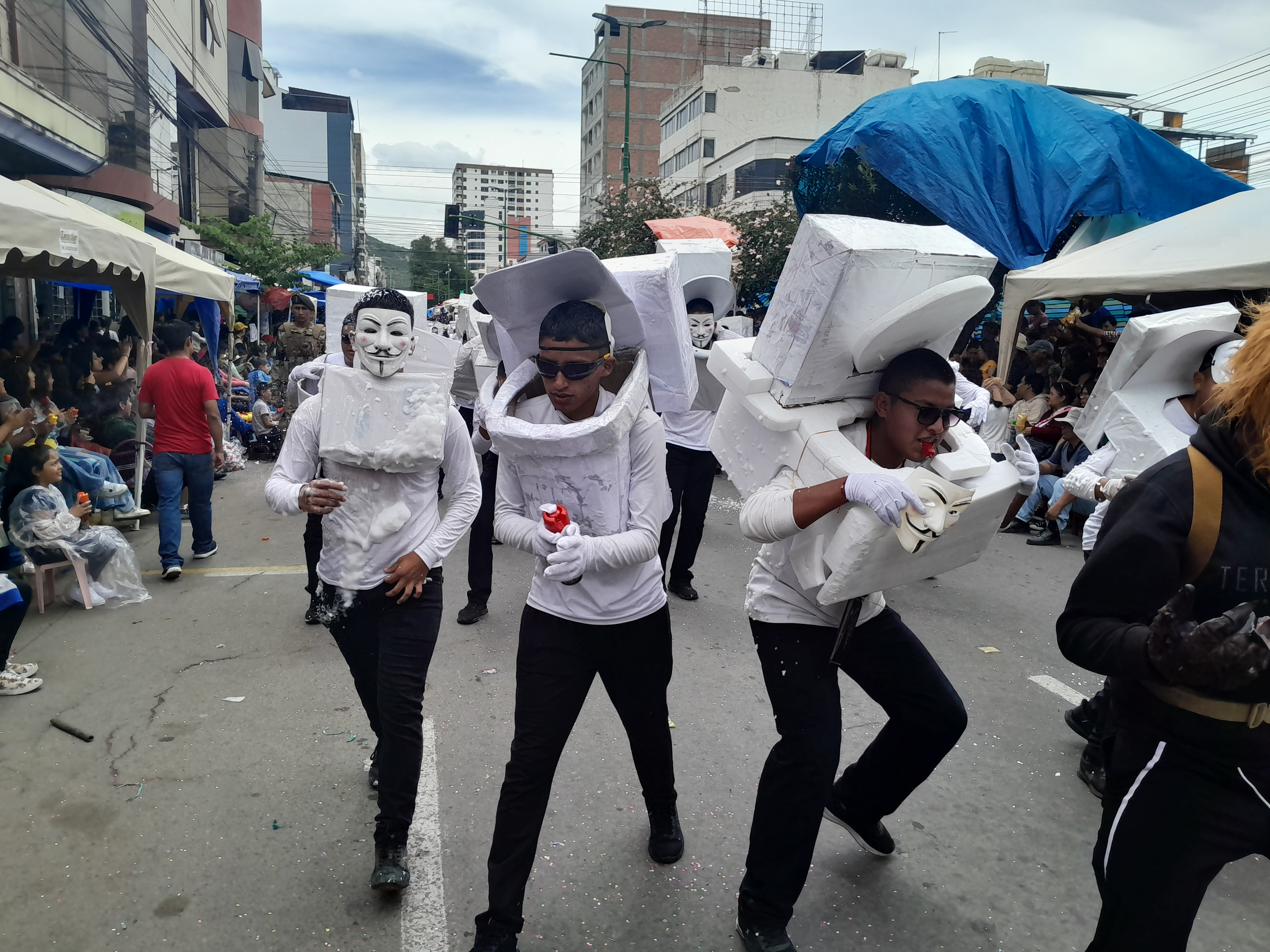
Skibidi Toilet cosplayers during the Corso de Corsos celebration of Cochabamba, Bolivia

Fans have expanded on the show's lore by making analysis videos and giving their theories in YouTube's comment section. There are Skibidi Toilet games on Roblox, a game platform, the two largest of which attract millions of players each month.

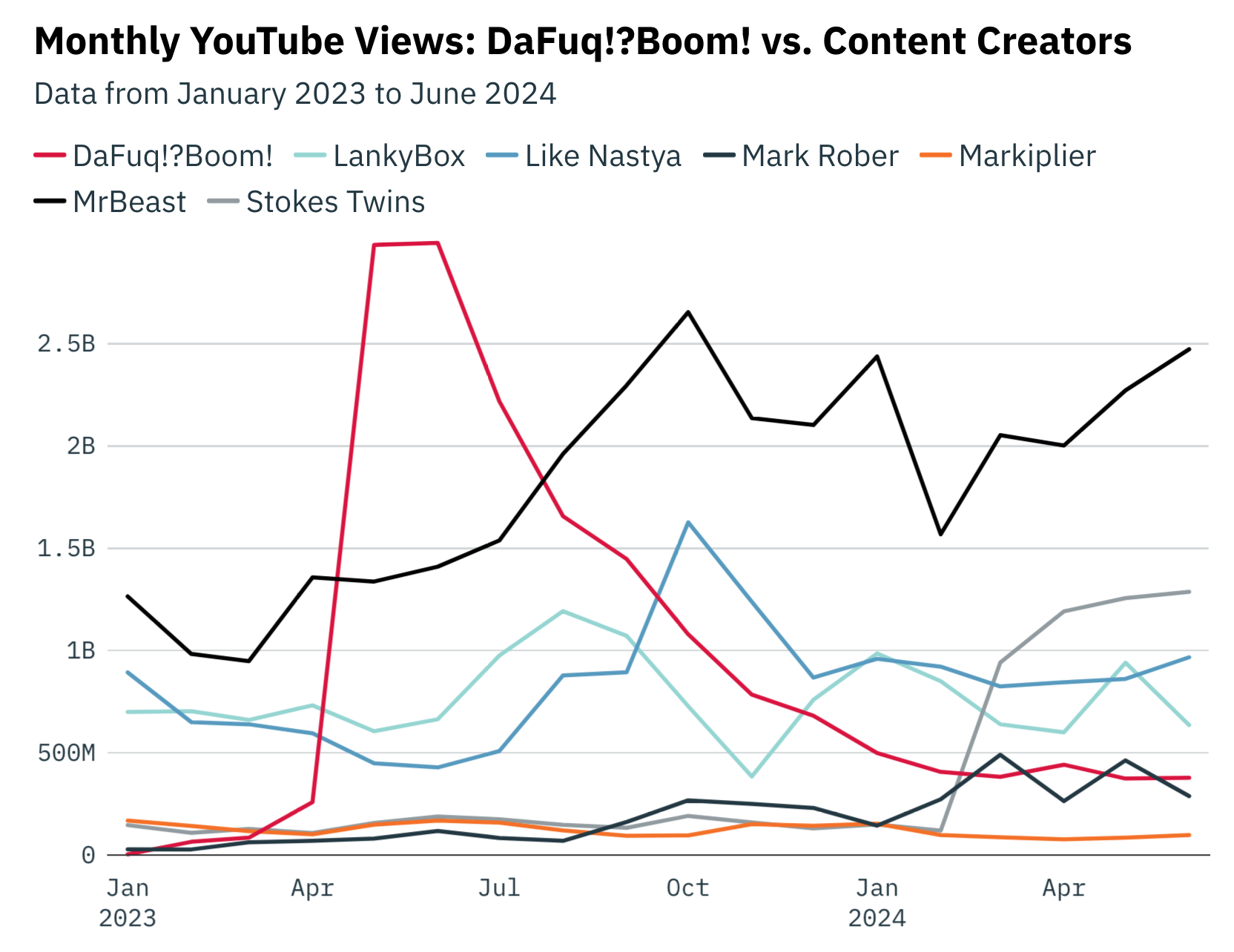
Monthly viewcount comparison with other popular YouTubers (Note: for example, YouTubers in the graph include Like Nastya, Mark Rober, Markiplier, MrBeast, and the Stokes Twins.) from the Variety magazine

In 2021, DaFuq!?Boom! had around one million subscribers. By November 2023, YouTube videos associated with Skibidi Toilet had accumulated over 65 billion views. On TikTok, the #skibiditoilet hashtag garnered 23 billion views by July 2024. In December 2023, the channel DaFuq!?Boom! had amassed 37 million subscribers, experiencing rapid growth that, on occasion, had surpassed growth of MrBeast, the most subscribed channel on YouTube. The Washington Post called it "the biggest online phenomenon of the year".

According to Tubefilter rankings, by the end of April 2023, DaFuq!?Boom! entered the 50 most viewed YouTube channels in the U.S., at 33rd place. By June, the channel had gained five billion views, making it the most viewed YouTube channel in the U.S. that month. On 24 July 2024, the channel had 17 billion total views, with 16.3 billion views from February 2023 to June 2024. The channel's views have since declined, with only 374.1 million views in May 2024.

Tubefilter's editor Sam Gutelle noted that the channel was formerly largely under the radar except for a few "animation diehards in the meme community". The Daily Dot's offshoot publication Passionfruit suspected the popularity of the series was due to how the "designs combined a simple, cute style with more uncanny elements", citing other popular characters like Sans and Siren Head.

Skibidi Toilet was referenced on The Late Show with Stephen Colbert, with a short parody animation depicting President Joe Biden as a Skibidi Toilet, dubbed "Skibidi Biden". Kotaku called the joke "the worst thing Stephen Colbert's ever done". One of the 250 snowplows of the Vermont Agency of Transportation was named "Skibidi Scooper", chosen by the Albany Community School. In 2025, police in Helena, Alabama reported that members of the extremist sextortion network 764 were publicly operating out of a forum called "Skibidi Farms", a name in reference to both Skibidi Toilet and the online harassment forum Kiwi Farms.

=== Critical reception ===
The lifestyle magazine Dazed called Skibidi Toilet "frenetic, unpredictable, funny and at times genuinely unsettling." Yahoo!'s In The Know compared its animation style to that of a mobile game, with "choppy movements and exaggerated facial expressions". Cartoon Brew, an animation-focused website, wrote that while Skibidi Toilet "may look rough around the edges compared to major studio fare [...] there is no question that Gerasimov is a filmmaker who understands pacing, camerawork, sound design, and how to tell a story."

Many publications highlighted a viral tweet in which Twitter user @AnimeSerbia called the series Generation Alpha's Slender Man. Insider said the series exemplifies the start of a new generation gaining prominence, using the relationship between millennials and Gen Z as an example, a claim that Indy100 repeated: "[Gen Z] will be facing the same mocking and ridicule they dished out to Millennials". News.com.au wrote that the series "is a timely reminder that Gen Alpha are on the horizon".

The Washington Post noted the series' uniqueness in creating a narrative entirely out of short-form videos and YouTube's ability to stay relevant while competing with TikTok. In a guest piece for Ryan Broderick's newsletter Garbage Day, Adam Bumas said the series leans into "weird internet aesthetics", creating a nostalgic element. Business Insider echoed this stance, remarking on the series' use of old video game assets.

An article by theatre firm The Civilians argued the series reflects Generation Alpha's fear of surveillance and dehumanization. Likewise, Laura Glitsos et al. argued the Cameramen represent the constant recording and 'sousveillance' Generation Alpha feels. They contend the series showcases the dystopia brought by the "monstrous digital", raising discussions about artificial life and environmental destruction.

Business Insider called the series "an endless arms race as both the toilets and their foes [produce] stronger fighters". Technology website Wired credited the show's minimal use of dialogue for removing language barriers and aiding in the show's global popularity. The New Yorker observed that whereas early episodes of the series were short in time frame and relied on jump scares from the Skibidi Toilets in the endings, later episodes were longer and often lack the signature "skibidi" song.

Several parental websites and Indonesian newspapers claimed that Skibidi Toilet's violence and bizarre visuals may have a harmful effect on young children, dubbing it "Skibidi Toilet syndrome" (Indonesian: sindrom Skibidi Toilet). The Guardian dismissed such claims as a "moral panic". The Daily Telegraph called on regulators to mandate age restrictions on online videos similar to the film industry, citing Skibidi Toilet's perceived violence. Meanwhile, Wired pointed out that, while the violence is consistent, it is limited to "cartoonish explosions and punches". Common Sense Media rated the series suitable for age 14 and above.

== Adaptations and licensing ==
On 24 July 2024, it was announced that filmmakers Adam Goodman and Michael Bay were "in talks" with Gerasimov for a movie and television series adaptation of Skibidi Toilet. Goodman revealed that the adaptation may be a live-action/animation hybrid film, and that it may be stylistically similar to the John Wick and District 9 franchises. The announcement was skeptically received: The A. V. Club said it would be difficult to "translate [...] Internet subculture into traditional formats", and Gizmodo wrote that a movie would have to be "unfathomably expensive to present an experience that's somehow 'deluxe' to its inspiration". The magazine Complex has commented that Bay would be a perfect filmmaker for the adaptation, citing his work in the Transformers film series. In May 2025, it was announced that the film had begun production at Invisible Narratives. Despite early reports saying that Bay was directing a Skibidi Toilet film, he denied them on 24 May 2025.

Skibidi Toilet toys at Walmart

The media company Invisible Narratives is run by Bay (chief creative advisor) and Goodman (CEO and founder). It has agreed to act as a brand licensing agency for Gerasimov. The company has made a licensing deal with Bonkers Toys, which is known for creating merchandise from YouTube content, to produce Skibidi Toilet toys. In 2024, Bonkers Toys released Skibidi Toilet mystery boxes and action figures in stores, including at Walmart. The National Entertainment Collectibles Association has been contracted to manufacture branded remote-controlled devices such as drones. American retailer Spirit Halloween has obtained a license to sell Skibidi Toilet costumes. The company said it encourages fan-run YouTube channels to create Skibidi Toilet content as long as attribution is present. On 18 December 2024, the video game Fortnite introduced items from Skibidi Toilet as purchasable cosmetics. In March 2025, Scholastic announced its partnership with Invisible Narratives to publish a series of Skibidi Toilet books.

In late 2023, a Digital Millennium Copyright Act (DMCA) claim was filed against sandbox game Garry's Mod, allegedly by Invisible Narratives, which said to be on Gerasimov's behalf. Garry Newman, the creator of Garry's Mod, shared the alleged notice on Discord on 29 July 2024. It claimed Garry's Mod was using copyrighted Skibidi Toilet characters including "Titan Cameraman, Titan Speakerman, Titan TV man, and Skibidi Toilet" as well as that "There is absolutely no licensed Steam, Valve, Garry's Mod content related to Skibidi Toilet." Gerasimov later posted that he did not send the claim, and that he was trying to contact Newman. Newman later confirmed to IGN that he and Gerasimov had been in touch and the matter had been resolved. The United States Copyright Office shows the character "Titan Cameraman" as being claimed by Invisible Narratives on 21 August 2023.

In January 2025, Invisible Narratives sued Dubai-based firm Next Level, alleging that it had fraudulently claimed and used Skibidi Toilet intellectual property as its own. Next Level registered copyrights and filed trademarks for Skibidi Toilet characters. The suit alleged Next Level had sent a fraudulent DMCA takedown notice to the official YouTube channel, forcing a season compilation video to be removed and potentially putting the channel at risk of termination. Next Level owner Sergey Osadchy claimed the series plagiarized a game he developed in 2020 named "Skibidi Toilet", though the game only began pre-orders in 2024. Invisible Narratives successfully filed a DMCA notice to Google Play to delist the game. The case was held in California by U.S. District Judge Noël Wise, who stated she would issue a preliminary restraining order prohibiting Next Level from issuing further copyright notices to the plaintiff. Next Level and Invisible reached a settlement on 9 June 2026, with Next Level agreeing to stop interfering and permanently terminate any involvement in Skibidi Toilet’s intellectual property and franchise worldwide.

== See also ==
- Elsagate, a YouTube controversy
- List of Internet phenomena
- Surreal humor
- Toilet humor
- YouTube poop, a genre of humorous mashups
