= The Lab (video game) =

2016 video game

- Developer: Valve
- Publisher: Valve
- Series: Portal
- Engine: Unity; Source 2 (Robot Repair)
- Platform: Windows
- Release: April 5, 2016
- Genre: Action
- Mode: Single-player

The Lab is a virtual reality (VR) video game developed by Valve and released for Windows on April 5, 2016. It uses VR technology to showcase a series of play experiences accessed through a hub room. The game is set in the Portal universe and offers eight different game types that involve short demo experiences that use different aspects of the VR capabilities. Variety is also offered beyond the experiences themselves by the amount of interactability with objects in the environment that is included. During the 20th Annual D.I.C.E. Awards, the Academy of Interactive Arts & Sciences nominated The Lab for "Immersive Reality Game of the Year".

== Gameplay ==
The majority of movement within The Lab uses full 3D motion via the HTC Vive tracking system and two hand-held motion controllers (or an attached Steam controller). In the hub world, the player can explore the space around them within the confines of their physical floorspace, while roaming further by using controller buttons to teleport to different parts of the area. This movement capability is also used in several of the minigame experiences. The motion controllers are also required to pick up and handle objects in the game world, including a bow, repair tools, and a bowling ball, along with acting as a physical object in the virtual space for minigames involving dodging projectiles. The player enters each of the respective minigames by picking up the named snowglobe strewn about the hub room and holding it close to their face.

== Content ==
There are eight different minigames available in The Lab. They exist as pocket universes within the pocket universe that is the hub area, itself within the Aperture Science lab.

=== Slingshot ===
Compared to the Angry Birds series of games, this minigame uses a calibration machine that shoots Personality Cores at piles of debris and explosives. The goal of the game is to cause as much destruction as possible within the number of fireable cores available. Each core has a different main personality trait, with a variety of voices contributing to the roles.

=== Longbow ===
An archery based game, the two motion controllers are used to aim and fire a bow, with one controller acting as the bow shaft and the other as the arrow. The player is tasked with defending a castle gate against an invading force while standing on top of the castle walls. It has been praised for its precise controls and range of motion, akin to archery outside of the game. The enemy models were represented by black figures represented in Aperture Science ads that had been illustrated in both Portal games. In addition to shooting arrows at these models to defeat them, aimed shots at targets also activate traps, such as burning oil.

=== Xortex ===
Described as a bullet hell type game, Xortex involves picking up a spaceship with the motion controllers and moving it around in the virtual space to avoid an increasingly difficult barrage of projectiles. The controlled spaceship can also fire back at enemy ships and the game features various levels, boss encounters, and a scoreboard. The ability to play the game by only using the player's upper body is one of the hallmarks of the minigame.

=== Postcards ===
This minigame is described as a "virtual holiday" that transports the player to the top of a mountain or an "Icelandic wilderness" where they can move around with the teleport system. A robot dog accompanies the player and fetch can be played with the canine by using a stick. The mountain area was created by combining many photographs of a mountain range nearby to the Valve headquarters, Vesper Peak. Additional environments can be reached either by manipulating the plug on the Postcard notice board in the Lab or by using the drop down menu presented on the mirror screen on the host PC. These include a Venice town square and a cave listed as "lava tube". The "lava tube" does not feature the robotic dog or sticks but instead has a balloon machine capable of inflating different coloured balloons that float about the cave.

=== Human Medical Scan ===
A medical-based experience, this minigame largely lacks gameplay of any kind, but instead features the future possibilities and application of VR technology in the medical and scientific fields. Human Medical Scan involves a 3D human figure that is made up of many CT scans where the player can peel away layers of the body to look at specific biological features.

=== Solar System ===
This minigame involves a virtual representation of the Solar System where the planets and other objects can be picked up, moved, and thrown.

=== Robot Repair ===
This minigame features a previous Valve-created tech demo for the HTC Vive that was originally released in March 2016. It features a human player inside a testing lab run by GLaDOS where they are tasked with repairing the robot Atlas from Portal 2. The minigame is largely presented as an "interactive comedy sketch" with a set script and events. In contrast with the other minigames, which were made using the Unity engine, Robot Repair uses Valve's Source 2 engine.

=== Secret Shop ===
Secret Shop puts the player in the item shop from Valve's multiplayer online battle arena (MOBA) video game Dota 2, with many objects from the game to interact with and secrets to discover. A number of spells can be set off by the player that will have various effects, including shrinking the player model.

== Development ==
As Valve's new game engine, Source 2, was still in development, they built most of The Lab using a third-party engine, Unity. Valve showed a demo of The Lab at the 2016 Game Developers Conference. Christopher Chin stated that the concept for the minigames were based around ideas on how to transfer other genres and game types into the VR world in an innovative way. Another minigame, Shooter, set in the Half-Life universe, was cancelled when it went over schedule.
