= Deadlock (video game) =

Upcoming video game

- Promotional art depicting the game's two patrons
- Developer: Valve
- Publisher: Valve
- Engine: Source 2
- Platform: Windows
- Genres: Third-person shooter, multiplayer online battle arena
- Mode: Multiplayer

Deadlock is an upcoming third-person shooter and multiplayer online battle arena (MOBA) game developed and published by Valve. It is set in an alternate urban fantasy New York City in the 20th century, featuring battles between two teams of six heroes trying to destroy each other's "Patron" gods as part of an occult ritual. Initially known as Neon Prime, Deadlock was leaked to the public in May 2024, and its Steam page was published in August. It has since remained in closed beta accessible through friend invite from playtesters.

== Gameplay ==
Deadlock is a third-person shooter and multiplayer online battle arena (MOBA) game, featuring two teams with six players each that battle each other. In each match, the twelve players control characters who split across three lanes (formerly four lanes) in a large city. To win, one team has to advance their "troopers", a category of non-player characters (NPCs) who fight alongside players, towards the enemy "patron", a possessed effigy, by defeating the other's team troopers, who respawn in waves, and players. Before defeating the patron, a team has to take down entities known as "guardians", "walkers", "base guardians", and "shrines" which are located on the lanes and protect the patron. Its style of gameplay has been described as a mix of Overwatch (2016), Dota 2 (2013), and Team Fortress 2 (2007).

Gameplay screenshot of Deadlock taken after the City Never Sleeps playtest update (c. September 2026), taken from the perspective of the hero Wraith. Wraith and Yamato are attacking the enemy Guardian on the green lane (Greenwich), while the opposing heroes Apollo, Mo & Krill defend.

Throughout the game, players earn "souls" as currency through different methods. Souls can be spent at shops on items that level their character's abilities and weapons. Certain items also provide the player with additional active abilities. Deadlock features various movement mechanics, including sliding, dashing, and double jumping, and players can also travel through the lanes via zip lines. The city features numerous alleyways and hidden paths, as well as systems of vents and crawlspaces, through which players can also navigate.

The Street Brawl game mode features two teams of four players being limited to only one lane, and item purchases being disabled. Street Brawl is divided into several rounds; with each round, players are offered to choose one of three randomly given items that sometimes include more powerful ones unique to Street Brawl.

A simplified representation of the game map. Three lanes extend towards the center of the map from either team's base, each marked by several objectives for the other team to destroy. Major neutral objectives, such as the urn or the bridge bonuses are colored in white. The mid-boss, depicted as a golden figure, rewards teams with up to three "rejuvenators," dropped upon its defeat, that revive fallen players.

=== Premise ===
Deadlock is set in an alternate New York City in the 20th century, nicknamed the "Cursed Apple". An event known as the "Maelstrom" opened several astral gates and revealed the supernatural to the world, bringing undead and magical creatures to Earth in places such as Central Park and "The Deep", located within the Bermuda Triangle, forcing humans to adapt and research the new phenomenon. The game takes place during the event known as the "Second Maelstrom". Two rival gods, known as the Hidden King and the Archmother, or collectively as the "Patrons", have each promised a wish to a team of six heroes in exchange for summoning them in a ritual, which involves destroying the enemy Patron.

== Development ==
Deadlock is being developed by Valve in the Source 2 video game engine. Its development allegedly started in 2018. References to its internal code name Citadel were discovered in the code for Dota 2 in 2019, and it was speculated at the time to be an entry in the Half-Life series due to sharing its name with the final area of Half-Life 2. In October 2022, Valve registered a trademark for Neon Prime; video game journalists suggested that it could be a new video game from the developer.

Duncan Drummond, co-creator and designer of Risk of Rain 2 (2019), is a gameplay designer on Deadlock, and its movement systems and design choices have been noted as similar to the Risk of Rain sequel. Dota 2 director IceFrog has contributed, and was speculated by a data miner to also be Deadlock's lead. Further details were reported from the same data miner in 2023, who speculated that it was an installment in the Dota series and "a sci-fi-oriented third-person 'MOBA-lite' that looks like Overwatch mixed with Team Fortress 2 mixed with Dota 2". He added that there was an external playtest during the same period. In August 2024, an anonymous Valve developer shared early footage of Deadlock.

Deadlock was leaked to the public in May 2024 by playtesters, revealing that Neon Prime was its previous name and that it evolved from a sci-fi oriented to a fantasy/steampunk art style. Gameplay details were leaked, suggesting it to be a third-person shooter taking place in a "modern steampunk European city". A data miner revealed that there were hundreds of playtesters by this point. In late May, Valve trademarked Deadlock. Valve officially announced Deadlock in August 2024 and published its Steam page, with game access available through friend invites from playtesters. Its description read that it was in early development "with lots of temporary art and experimental gameplay", and the page featured a teaser image and a short trailer. Upon publishing the Steam page, developers removed the non-disclosure agreement (NDA) dialog box. Valve created a Discord server where it publishes updates and news. Before its Steam page was published, Deadlock had a concurrent player count of 20,000. In October 2026, it reached a concurrent player count of 303,347, surpassing that of Valve's 2007 game Team Fortress 2.

Initially, there were 20 characters available to play; this has since increased to 44 as of October 2026. (Note: In January 2025, it was reported that Deadlock had 26 characters. Updates in August 2025, January 2026, and September 2026 introduced six more characters each, bringing the total to 44.) In May 2025, it was reported that there was a second, more exclusive private playtest, as a streamer accidentally leaked then-upcoming heroes during a livestream. As of May 2026, Deadlock is available only on Windows and is in beta stage of development.

Since Deadlock was announced in August 2024, Valve has worked on adding anti-cheat detection. In February 2025, Valve published an update in which it lowered the number of lanes from four to three. Later in May 2025, Valve published an update in which the shop and items saw changes. In August, the game's visual style was overhauled and six characters were added one by one through an in-game vote. In January 2026, the Old Gods, New Blood update was released, once again with six characters added through voting, as well as adding two items and the Street Brawl mode. As of May 2026, it is the most wishlisted game on Steam. In September 2026, the City Never Sleeps update was released with six new characters added through an in-game vote, and a big overhaul to the map, adding different types of creatures and biomes that they inhabit.

== Reception ==
A screenshot of the map, showing different buildings and signs, incorporated into the gameplay area

While it was still internally known as Neon Prime, VG247 described the aesthetic as "futuristic sci-fi/cyberpunk" and "Japan-inspired".

Sean Hollister of The Verge published a full review of Deadlock in its early development in August 2024. He noted that since he had not signed a NDA, he was open to review it, despite a dialog box telling him not to share any information about it with others. He was subsequently banned from the game. Some readers responded negatively to the article's publication. Wired's Megan Farokhmanesh speculated that the secretive release strategy was a publicity stunt to tempt players to leak the game, building hype. Aftermath's Riley MacLeod defended Hollister's reporting, saying that although ignoring Valve's request may have been impolite, Hollister was not legally nor professionally obligated to keep the details secret and had not violated journalistic ethics.

Writing for PC Gamer, Lincoln Carpenter described the main menu music as "straight out of a Tim Burton joint". Ash Parrish of The Verge compared the map's looks to City 17 from Half-Life 2, while Tyler Wilde of PC Gamer compared the game to BioShock Infinite. Matt Cox of Eurogamer highlighted the map's looks, describing it as "alternative-world fantasy goth New York", adding that it "oozes personality". Emily Maisy of Gamereactor specified that it is set in the 1940s New York, known as the Cursed Apple, noting that its world is filled with occult and magic. Harvey Randall of PC Gamer praised the map, including the midboss arena, noting that the map features a lot of avenues, staircases, and even an underground tunnel network, as well as the variety of game's characters.

Ted Litchfield of PC Gamer wrote that it was "hard not to be excited" for a new Valve game and would play it on day one, while Justin Wagner, also of PC Gamer, praised Valve's willingness to experiment with the game's core format and mechanics during the early development period, setting it apart from other live-service games. Diego Nicolás Argüello of Kotaku noted that the game has developed a thriving fan community due to its charismatic roster of heroes and unique setting. One of the heroes added in the City Never Sleeps update, the Rat King, was based on a player-created concept that became popular within the community.

The female gargoyle character Ivy, a statue that magically came to life and protects Spanish Harlem from crime syndicates, unexpectedly became one of the most popular characters, receiving numerous pieces of fan art. Valve redesigned her model in May 2025 to bring her closer to the fan interpretation, toning down the fearsome aspects of her face.
