= Tower Unite =

2025 video game

- Developer: PixelTail Games
- Publisher: PixelTail Games
- Designer: Macklin Guy
- Engine: Unreal Engine 4
- Platform: Windows
- Release: Windows; 19 April 2025
- Genres: Party game, sandbox
- Modes: Single-player, multiplayer

Tower Unite is a virtual world party game and sandbox game developed by PixelTail Games. It was first released in early access on Steam in April 2016 and received a full release in April 2025. The game is set on an island in the style of a resort theme park, where players can interact, play mini-games, and join lobbies via matchmaking. In addition, players can host public or private virtual spaces known as "condos", customized with furniture and props.

The concept was initially developed in late 2006, but development was prolonged due to multiple development cycles and changing teams. It was eventually released to the public in 2009 under the name GMod Tower, as a mod for the Source engine game Garry's Mod.

In 2015, the developers founded PixelTail Games and began development of Tower Unite as a standalone game. The project received a developer grant from Epic Games and was successfully crowdfunded on Indiegogo that same year. Following the release of the game, GMod Tower was subsequently shutdown.

== Gameplay ==
View of the tower and total island area accessible in plaza lobbies (2024)

Tower Unite is set in an open world island with a central plaza, tower, several stores and buildings, and a wharf with carnival-style games. Main features of the island include a casino, arcade, roller coaster, bowling alley, monorail and Ferris wheel, to name some. The outer areas of the island include beaches, pools, huts, and a lighthouse, with areas for fishing. The island has a simulated day-night cycle.

The theme of the plaza is updated to celebrate holidays and events such as Halloween and Christmas, and is populated by dynamic NPCs and time-based mini-game events. Playing games, partaking in events, and completing achievements earns an in-game currency, which can be used to buy things in the game; no real money is ever used.

Players can enter buildings, buy goods from NPCs, customise their character, and talk by voice and chat text. As a virtual world game, there is no single aim or gameplay loop, but a variety of activities to support player interaction and world creation.

=== User-generated content ===
In version 0.6, Tower Unite introduced user-generated content with Steam Workshop integration. This allows for custom player models, props, and vehicles, as well as the sharing of condos.

Tower Unite comes with tools to help with packaging content, and supports the COLLADA format for 3D models.

=== Condos ===
Players can host their own private or public lobbies from a selection of maps, including buildings and open areas. They can decorate these areas or build structures, using props and furniture bought in-game or acquired from the Steam Workshop. In GMod Tower, the condo feature was initially intended as a home-like environment which players could customize, but the creation options have substantially expanded in Tower Unite, allowing players to design elaborate spaces in the style of larger maps.

=== Game worlds ===
Separate from condos and plaza activities, many of the main games in Tower Unite are known as game worlds and are hosted and played as individual activities. There are several game worlds available.

- Mini-golf
- Slaughterday Night Live (deathmatch)
- Ball Race (racing platformer in the style of Super Monkey Ball)
- Virus (FPS in the style of tag)
- Little Crusaders (asymmetrical multiplayer combat game)
- Zombie Massacre (third-person wave shooter)
- Accelerate Kart Racing

In addition, two further game worlds are displayed but marked unavailable, and are currently in development: Planet Panic and Horror Hill.

=== Other activities ===
Tower Unite features an expanding range of smaller activities that the player can pursue, including fishing, arcade games, casino games, and finding collectibles. Some of these activities can be tracked in the Collection Book, a sub-menu which logs player statistics and activities.

== Development and release ==
The idea of Tower Unite was first expressed in a concept in late 2006, with various attempts to develop it which were substantially delayed with numerous team changes. By 2009, the game was finally developed as GMod Tower, a mod for the Source engine game Garry's Mod. It became a cult hit and was one of the more significant Garry's Mod projects of its time, later featured in a Rock Paper Shotgun article in 2012 as a notable mod.

In 2015, the developers founded PixelTail Games and began development of Tower Unite as a standalone game. This would lead to the retirement of GMod Tower, with a focus on building the concept further in a modern game engine. PixelTail Games received two forms of funding, a developer grant from Epic Games, and subsequently a successful crowdfunding effort on Indiegogo that same year.

The first public version of Tower Unite was released on the Steam store on the 8th of April 2016. It was released through the Early Access programme. In addition, Tower Unite supports cloud services including Nvidia GeForce Now, In November 2016, an experimental Linux client was released. In March 2019, the game was included in a Humble Bundle monthly pack.

On 19 April 2025, Tower Unite left the Steam Early Access program after nine years and was published as a full release. A month later, Steam Deck controller support was added. The release announcement noted that development would continue on the game, including new features and content, but that PixelTail Games would also expand into new projects.

=== Pricing and DLC ===
As a design choice, Tower Unite has not implemented in-game purchases, microtransactions, nor subscriptions. Consequently, the price of the game has increased twice during development, first in May 2020 increasing from US$14.99 to US$19.99. In January 2024, the price increased to US$24.99, with a developer for PixelTail Games stating the project was "just getting by" and "needed financial support." In July 2024, the price decreased back to US$19.99.

On January 30 2024, PixelTail Games released the Supporter Pack DLC on Steam. It gives players a limited range of cosmetic supporter items, but is primarily intended as a way for existing players to support continued development.

== Reception ==
Tower Unite was praised for its Steam Workshop integration and user-generated content, including by journalist Jeff Gerstmann and gaming site Giant Bomb. In 2022, the website hosted their game of the year deliberations virtually inside Tower Unite. Brendan Caldwell of Rock Paper Shotgun described Tower Unite as a "bizarre resort town" and compared elements of it to The Sims and PlayStation Home.

In October 2023, GameRant ranked Tower Unite 14 out of 21 in a list of top FPS games for children, describing the game as a "hidden gem." In 2024, TheGamer ranked Tower Unite's minigolf game world among the "best mini golf games you can play". That same year, Monica Phillips of Hardcore Gamer praised Tower Unite as a notable multiplayer social game for Steam Deck, but criticised its large file size and relatively poor performance in heavily-decorated condos.

== See also ==
- List of party video games
