= Garry Newman =

British video game developer (born 1982)

- Born: 20 May 1982 (age 44); England
- Occupations: Modder and Game developer
- Known for: Creating Garry's Mod and founding Facepunch Studios
- Notable work: Garry's Mod, Rust, S&box
- Children: 2
- Website: https://garry.net

Garry Newman (born 20 May 1982) is a British video game developer and modder. In 2004, Newman founded Facepunch Studios while working on Garry's Mod, a Half-Life 2 modification. As of October 2010, he lives in Walsall, England.

== Early life ==
Newman started as a web programmer working with PHP on a dating website, however, he was fired from that job for creating his own dating site outside of work. While living with his family, he created his first project, Facewound, which was intentionally designed to be a 2D game using 3D acceleration technology. He intended to sell games as shareware. Development on Facewound was halted after problems with the project's code and Garry switched his focus to the creation of Garry's Mod.

== Career ==
=== Facepunch Studios ===
Garry started experimenting with Valve's Source Engine for a Half-Life 2 modification called Garry's Mod. This was similar to another modification known as "JB Mod". The first version of Garry's Mod was released in 2004, and it brought together a group of collaborators called "Team Garry," later renamed to "Facepunch" because of the comic nature of the name. In 2004, Newman founded Facepunch Studios while working on Garry's Mod.

=== Game engine critic ===
After Unity Technologies warned in 2023 that games developed with the engine would pay an extra publishing license fee, Newman expressed his disappointment with the engine, announcing that he would not use it for his Rust sequel and that he had plans to remake the first game in another engine.
