= S&box =

Multiplayer game creation platform

- Developer: Facepunch Studios
- Release: April 28, 2026; 6 months ago
- Written in: C++ (runtime); C# (scripting)
- Engine: Source 2
- Operating system: Windows, Linux
- License: MIT License
- Website: sbox.game
- Repository: github.com/Facepunch/sbox-public

S&box (stylised in lowercase and pronounced Sandbox) is a 2026 open source video game development engine and online game platform by Facepunch Studios built on the proprietary Source 2 engine. S&box was released on April 28, 2026, and is intended to be a spiritual successor to Garry's Mod, allowing users to create a variety of games and experiences.

== History ==
In September 2015, Garry Newman, the creator of Garry's Mod, first mentioned that a sequel was in development. In September 2017, Facepunch Studios officially unveiled S&box as a prototype. This early version was built using Unreal Engine 4 (UE4), incorporating a hotloading C# layer. The developers used UE4 for core features like rendering, networking, and physics. At this point, it was uncertain whether S&box would be released as a moddable platform or used internally by Facepunch.

In March 2020, it was suggested that S&box was the sequel to Garry's Mod. However, the project was put on hold while the team decided to switch engines. The team eventually chose Source 2 by February 2021, the same engine used to create Half-Life: Alyx. This decision was made to make it easier to transfer tools from Garry's Mod and to update the engine with tools like ModelDoc and AnimGraph. By July 2021, a developer preview queue was established, granting access based on Garry's Mod and Half-Life: Alyx workshop activity. This allowed users to create custom game modes, maps, models, and Source Filmmaker projects.

In July 2023, Facepunch introduced an invite system, distributing codes on Fridays to existing users based on their game usage. These codes were not Steam keys, and had to be entered on the asset.party (now sbox.game) website. This system was implemented to test the backend systems and to grow the user base. However, a major shift in the development process occurred in August 2023. At this point, Facepunch undertook a significant retooling of S&box, moving away from the traditional Source engine's client/server architecture. The goal was to create a more flexible and intuitive development environment, and this involved replacing the entity system with a scene system similar to that used in Unity and Godot. They began using C# to control the engine, allowing greater control over the game loop. As a result of this retooling, new invites were paused, and old ones were expired. The developers focused internally on making the engine more flexible, aiming for an engine that would go beyond the Garry's Mod community.

In July 2024, S&box opened for public preview access, allowing developers to test and provide feedback on various game modes and projects. Facepunch stated that they plan to make iterative improvements for the next few decades. By November 2024, S&box launched its Steam page, confirming the inclusion of an official sandbox mode. Facepunch has stated that S&box would not be released without it.

Facepunch released S&box's source code under the MIT License in November 2025, though the underlying Source 2 code remains proprietary. In late March 2026, Facepunch secured a major licensing agreement with Valve. The deal allows creators to export projects directly from S&box and publish them as standalone games on Steam entirely royalty free. S&box officially released on April 28, 2026.

In late August 2026, Facepunch began a beta test for compiled builds of the client and editor for Linux as part of their cross-platform initiative. It was eventually released to the public on Steam in early September.

== Features ==
S&box is described as a game engine and platform where users can create their own games. It is built on the Source 2 engine with a C# layer. The engine has a hotload system, which allows developers to see changes to their code take effect immediately without compiling or restarting the game. The platform features a scene system, similar to Godot and Unity, which allows for faster iteration, with everything being easily visible and accessible.

It offers a range of tools, including a custom editor for map creation, a terrain system for open worlds, ActionGraph for visual scripting, and ShaderGraph for creating shaders. S&box also supports virtual reality game creation and play. There is no need to install or subscribe to games or addons; users can simply click to play.

S&box incorporates cloud-based assets, allowing creators to drag and drop assets into their scenes without manual downloading or subscribing. In addition to the game creation tools, S&box features a benchmark system, allowing the developers to track performance and identify regressions. The platform includes features for multiplayer, with multiplayer being built into the engine.

The developers intend to allow users to export their creations as standalone games that can be sold on Steam and other platforms without licensing fees or royalties. Alternatively, the platform features a system called the playfund that allows developers to monetise their games.

== Reception ==
User reviews posted online to Steam for S&box shortly after its release were reported to have been "mixed" by gaming sources. In a Steam Deck HQ article released on the game's launch day, Noah Kupetsky wrote that "[he] can see it getting better and better as the community starts to build it," but would also surmise that "[it's] not the greatest experience, but it's definitely okay." Writing for PC Gamer, Morgan Park would challenge the developers' claim that S&box was the "'spiritual successor' to Garry's Mod", arguing that the introduction of microtransactions and quality of content on release were too disqualifying, saying "if that spirit is present, I've yet to encounter it. None of the qualities that made Gmod an amazing, lasting anomaly of PC gaming are relevant to what Facepunch has actually made here: Roblox."

S&box has received criticism for containing AI slop, with IGN reporting on the backlash amongst users unhappy over it hosting games created through the use of generative AI in April 2026. In a response, Newman stated that "[we] don't encourage using AI to be creative. We don't encourage using AI to create games for you. We'll be taking action to promote human creativity and push obviously AI-created slop off the main page." Newman would further address the backlash in update notes to S&box the following month, calling it "painful" for him, and estimated that 24 percent of Steam user reviews cited AI as a point of contention. He'd further add "[it's] a UGC platform, there is always going to be dog shit" before reiterating his intention to minimise AI-created content "floating to the top" of the main page. An update in May of that same year added a rating system, penalizing and lowering the ranking and visibility of games with miniatures generated by generative AI; however, there is no total ban on AI, as it is considered a learning and productivity tool.
