= Facepunch Studios =

British video game company

Facepunch Studios Ltd
- Logo used since 2020
- Type: Private
- Industry: Video games
- Founded: June 2004; 22 years ago
- Founder: Garry Newman
- Headquarters: Birmingham, England
- Key people: Garry Newman; Craig Gwilt
- Products: Garry's Mod; Rust; S&box
- Revenue: ▼£77.25 million (2024)
- Operating income: ▼£26.41 million (2024)
- Net income: ▼£20.26 million (2024)
- Total assets: ▲£82.08 million (2024)
- Total equity: ▲£83.98 million (2024)
- Number of employees: 116 (2026)
- Parent: Facepunch Group Limited
- Website: facepunch.com

Facepunch Studios Ltd is a British video game developer and publisher headquartered in Birmingham, England, founded in June 2004 and incorporated on 17 March 2009 by Garry Newman. The company is most known for its sandbox video game Garry's Mod and survival game Rust. Its most recent game is S&box, which is regarded as a spiritual successor to Garry's Mod.

== History ==
Facepunch Studios was founded by Garry Newman in June 2004 for the forthcoming release of Facewound. Newman and his collaborators intended to use this studio name instead of one of their personal names to appear more professional. The name "Facepunch" came from the brainstorming of names for the game Facewound – where something "stupidly macho" was required. Two names were chosen at the end: Facepunch and Facewound. Facewound was used for the game, but Facepunch was deemed "too funny sounding to just leave to die" – and so was used as the name for the company.

In 2004, Garry Newman started the development of Garry's Mod, originally a side project, which eventually took over the Facewound forum as well as most of Newman's time. Facewound was later postponed and cancelled, and Facepunch Studio disbanded. Garry's Mod has become the flagship game of Facepunch Studios, regularly being one of the top played Steam games, having been released near Steam's inception. As of March 2023, the studio has over 50 employees.

=== Garry's Mod ===
Garry's Mod started out as a sandbox mode for tinkering in Valve's Source engine. Not truly considered a video game, and more of a playground, the game takes assets from compatible Source engine games like Half-Life 2, Team Fortress 2, Portal, etc., and allows users to pose them with different tools offered by Garry's Mod. As of September 2021, the game has sold over 20 million copies.

=== Rust ===
Rust is an online multiplayer survival game, based on games such as DayZ. Rust's inception stemmed from Facepunch's frustration with DayZ's gameplay; inheriting its cruel player versus player model and Minecraft's crafting and building aspects. Rust's grand concept was to develop a game where the players would be able to mold the environment: hunting, scavenging, gathering, and looting for survival; and players themselves impeding or assisting each other's success.

Although the game has been criticised for being too brutal, Facepunch Studios has intimated that an artificial scoreboard, encouraging players to "play nice", would be to the detriment of the game: "There shouldn't be a system hanging around forcing people to be good. It removes a lot of gameplay fun."

Rust sold over 150,000 copies in its first two weeks. Garry's Mod, in comparison, only sold 34,000 in two weeks. By 2017, it had sold over five million. The game officially released out of early access in February 2018. Facepunch stopped selling the Linux version of Rust in July 2018 and had officially dropped support for it by August 2019.

Facepunch paired up with video game studio Double Eleven in 2016 to begin work on a console version of Rust. The developers struggled with performance and optimization of the game due to the difference between PC and console hardware. A pre-order beta test took place between 23 April and 6 May 2021, allowing for players to experience the console version before its expected release on 20 May 2021.

The game has three additional content packs for purchase, the "Instruments Pack", the "Sunburn Pack" and the "Voice Props Pack". The Instruments Pack was released on 5 December 2019, featuring a variety of instruments to play in game. The instruments are compatible with real-life MIDI devices, allowing players to record their music. This was the first paid DLC Facepunch has released for Rust. Released on 9 July 2020, the Sunburn Pack grants access to various cosmetic and building options for players. The Voice Props Pack being released on 1 July 2021, offers a variety of disco-themed items, some sound recording capabilities and dance gestures.

=== Clatter ===
Clatter is a one-on-one turn-based strategy game where players take turns attacking their opponent with battle robots until one side has run out of robots. The game features a wide range of robots to choose from, each with unique attacks, movements, and design. The game released on 10 December 2018.

=== Chippy ===
Chippy is a twin-stick bullet-hell shooter with destructible bosses that came out of the studio's Facepunch Prototypes program. The game was released on Steam on 14 June 2019. It was later released on Nintendo Switch in June 2022.

=== S&box ===
S&box (stylized as s&box) is a spiritual successor to Garry's Mod. Newman stated Facepunch was working on a Garry's Mod sequel in late 2015 with a focus on virtual reality. It was formally announced in 2017 as being developed on Unreal Engine 4, but development was paused in 2019 and later shifted to Valve's Source 2 engine in March 2020. The game features user-created gamemodes. A public release was planned for the second half of 2021, with a select group already having received early access to its closed beta. In S&box, players can pick from many gamemodes similar to Garry's Mod. The game uses C# as a backend for user-created content.

== Games developed ==
Year	Title	Platform(s)	Note(s)
2006	Garry's Mod	Linux, macOS, Windows	
2018	Rust	macOS, Windows, PlayStation 4, Xbox One	Originally released as early access in 2013
2018	Clatter	Windows	
2019	Chippy	Windows, Nintendo Switch	
2026	S&box	Windows, Linux	
