= Half-Life: Full Life Consequences =

4-episode Machinima series

- Genre: Comedy
- Created by: Djy1991
- Based on: Half-Life: Full Life Consequences by Squirrelking
- Original language: English
- No. of episodes: 4

Original release
- Network: YouTube
- Release: January 23, 2008 – May 23, 2009

Half-Life: Full Life Consequences is a 4-episode Machinima series animated within the video game Garry's Mod and published on the video sharing website YouTube. Based on a fan fiction work of the same name, the series follows the exploits of the character "John Freeman", the unknown brother of Gordon Freeman from the Half-Life video game series. The first episode in the series was uploaded on January 23, 2008, by user Djy1991. The fourth and last episode was uploaded May 23, 2009. The series was praised for its humor and ability to elevate its source material.

== Format ==
Each episode is adapted from a corresponding story by fan fiction author Squirrelking that was posted on the website FanFiction.net. The original text of the story is narrated over video captured in the game Garry's Mod, often with accompanying music and sound effects. Each episode is voiced by a different narrator, each credited by an online handle.

== Reception and legacy ==
The series was well received by viewers. Within a week after uploading, episode one was featured by several well-established internet magazines and blogs such as Destructoid, Kotaku, and Boing Boing. Video game journalist Justin McElroy praised it as "an awesome piece of classic fan fiction written by a nine-year-old and then animated by a group of evil geniuses." Within a year it had received over 1 million views. The popularity of Half-Life: Full Life Consequences inspired other spinoff works, many adapting other Squirrelking fan fiction.

Although the fan fiction author Squirrelking was often cited as being a young child, it was later revealed to be a hoax account with the goal of making something "so mind-numbingly bad that it stands the test of time as one of the worst things ever written."

In 2019, the series was showcased during the 12 Days of Garry's Mod event on the official Garry's Mod website.

== Episodes ==
No.	Title	Directed by	Written by	Narrated by	Original release date
1	"Half-Life: Full Life Consequences"	Djy1991	Squirrelking	blind51de	January 23, 2008
John Freeman, an office worker and brother of Gordon Freeman, receives a message from Gordon asking for his assistance. John dons his lab coat and rides his motorcycle to where his brother is, encountering monsters such as a Headcrab zombie police officer and ghosts haunting a house. John arrives in Ravenholm, where Gordon is fighting the Final Boss. John blinds the Final Boss in one eye with a weapon he found and Gordon is able to defeat it. As the brothers reunite, a giant appears and crushes Gordon to death while John manages to escape. John swears vengeance on the giant.
2	"Half-Life: Full-life Consequences 2: What Has Tobe [sic] Done"	Djy1991	Squirrelking	Cannon590A	February 27, 2008
John escapes from Ravenholm and returns to his office, where he discovers how to defeat the giant. Arriving back at Ravenholm, John uses a rocket launcher to defeat the giant. While John mourns at the site where Gordon was killed, a headcrab appears and latches onto Gordon's head, reviving him into a hostile zombie.
3	"Half-Life: Full-life Consequences 3: Hero Beggining [sic]"	Djy1991	Squirrelking	Dwarfio	March 3, 2009
Henry Freeman, son of John Freeman, lives in a city under control of the Combine with his mom. Henry stands up to Combine soldiers assaulting a girl on the street, resulting in his mom being killed by them. Henry kills the soldiers in retaliation and rallies the city to fight back against the Combine. Henry leads the rebels towards the Citadel, only to be confronted by the Combine. The two groups fight, with humans gaining the upper hand, only for a portal to open in the sky and bring in more Combine, led by the Dark Man. As the humans prepare to fight back, another portal opens in the sky, which John Freeman comes out of.
4	"Half-Life: Full-Life Consequences: Free Man"	Djy1991	Squirrelking	LordTeisel	May 23, 2009
John assists Henry and the humans in fighting against the Combine, pushing them back into the Citadel. The Dark Man presses a button to make the Citadel self-destruct, and reveals himself to be Gordon Freeman, captured by the Combine after becoming a zombie and experimented on to work with them. John and Gordon fight as Henry and the humans attempt to stop the Citadel from exploding. John kicks off the device controlling Gordon, and a now-conscious but dying Gordon apologies for his actions and urges John to save humanity before passing away. John tells Henry to evacuate the city as he goes further into the Citadel, fighting the Combine and giving his son enough time to get to safety as the Citadel explodes. With the Citadel and the Combine gone, a new city is built, Henry is elected president, and a statue is erected in memory of John Freeman.
