= Rust (video game) =

2018 survival video game

- Developers: Facepunch Studios; Double Eleven
- Publisher: Facepunch Studios
- Engine: Unity
- Platforms: macOS; Windows; PlayStation 4; PlayStation 5; Xbox One; Xbox Series X/S
- Release: macOS, Windows; 8 February 2018; PlayStation 4, Xbox One; 21 May 2021; PlayStation 5, Xbox Series X/S; 26 June 2025
- Genre: Survival
- Mode: Multiplayer

Rust is a 2018 multiplayer survival video game developed by Facepunch Studios. It was first released in early access in December 2013 and received its full release in February 2018. Rust is available on Windows and macOS. Console versions for PlayStation 4 and Xbox One developed in conjunction with Double Eleven were released in May 2021. Native versions for PlayStation 5 and Xbox Series X/S were released in June 2025. Rust was initially created as a clone of DayZ, a popular mod for ARMA 2, with crafting elements akin to those in Minecraft.

The objective of Rust is to survive in the wilderness using gathered or stolen materials. Players must successfully manage their hunger, thirst, and health, or risk dying. Despite the presence of hostile animals such as bears, wolves and big cats such as panthers, the primary threat to the player is other players due to the game being solely multiplayer. Combat is accomplished through firearms and various weapons, such as bows. In addition, vehicles controlled by non-player characters will occasionally roam, attacking armed players. Rust features crafting, though initially limited until the discovery of specific items in the game's open world. To stay protected, players must build bases or join clans to improve their chance of survival. Raiding is a major aspect of Rust. Rust supports modded servers which can add additional content.

The game functions on a system of 'Wipes' in which servers reset player progress weekly, biweekly or monthly following a set monthly schedule enforced by Facepunch known as 'Force Wipe'. Force Wipes reset not only player structures but also resets player crafting blueprints effectively fully restarting player progress on the first Thursday of each month for the release of a new update.

Rust was first released in December 2013 to the Steam Early Access program. During this period of development, the gameplay was changed significantly. Dangerous wildlife replaced zombies as the primary environmental threat and several fundamental revisions to the crafting system were released, along with general improvements and feature additions. While in Early Access, Rust was ported to the Unity 5 game engine, providing substantial graphical changes. The game also introduced immutable, predetermined skin colour tied to players' Steam account details. Despite being fully released, the game continues to receive updates.

Throughout Rust's alpha release, critical reviews were mixed, with many comparisons made to other survival games. Rust was commonly explained as being a mixture of DayZ and Minecraft. During this period, reviewers frequently noted the game's unfinished nature. During its pre-release phase, critics praised the concept and gameplay and by March 2017, Rust had sold over five million copies. After leaving Early Access, it received mixed reviews from critics. The player vs player combat and survival aspects were highlighted by those who enjoyed the game, though reviewers were critical of the harsh beginner experience and the constant need to grind for materials. The game has continued to be successful post-release and has been listed as one of the best survival games.

== Gameplay ==
As a multiplayer-only video game, Rust pits players against each other in a harsh, open world environment with the sole goal of survival. Animals, such as wolves, bears and big cats, act as a looming threat, but the primary danger comes from other players.

=== Joining a game ===
Players can choose from thousands of official, community, or private game servers. Each servers have different settings for game types ("Vanilla" or "Modded"), difficulties, player count, and various rules (day-night cycle, loot generation speed, etc.). Each server features only one massive map and accommodate up to a thousand players.

A core feature of the game is the Wipe, where everything on the map is reset to the original state, including the removal of players and player-built structures. Wipe frequencies can range from several weeks to several months. The only exceptions are blueprints (researched recipes for craftable items) which might be preserved between wipes depending on server settings. This forces new players and veterans alike to start from the same point and race to progress.

=== Exploration ===
Maps can be procedurally generated or pre-built. The map is often a big island (often referred to as "mainland") with several smaller islets around it. There are often three main biomes: arctic, temperate and arid. The temperate biome can be divided into 3 sub-types: plains, jungle and swamp. Besides some shared features, each biome has their own distinct resources and hazards.

Mainland has various geographical features such as rivers, lakes, caves, hills, mountains and valleys, each offering distinct characteristics, encouraging different play styles. For example, rivers provide abundant access to fresh water, allowing easy farming, while caves can make formidable strongholds with limited entry points. Various monuments - man-made structures and infrastructures such as military base, light house, outpost, oil rig - dot the land and ocean, providing either safe zones for trading and socializing, or high-value targets with valuable loots to encourage PvP combat.

Horses, bicycles, motorcycles, cars and trains can be used to navigate the land. The cars are particularly customizable, with modular parts allowing them to be equipped with extra beds (spawn points), armor or storage.

Options to traverse water include swimming, bodyboarding, boats with outboard motors, submarines and tugboats. The tugboat, in particular, can be equipped with spawn points, storage containers and various facilities, effectively turning it into a full-fledged mobile base.

Airborne vehicles, such as hot air balloons, mini-copters and scrap-helicopters can also be used to explore the map quickly.

=== Scavenging ===
A player using the starting rock to gather wood

Upon joining, all players start with a rock and a torch. The torch is for illumination, while the rock is both a resource-gathering tool and a weapon.

The game features respawning resource nodes that provide various raw material such as stone, metal ore, sulfur ore, and woods. Cloth and food can be gathered from plants. Meat and bone can be harvested from animals. Besides the starting rock, there are various tools that can speedup harvesting efficiency.

The other source for scavenging are various crates and barrels that spawn at designated points on the maps. Higher tiered resources spawn in monuments, especially military-owned structures, making these locations a hot spot for players and groups competing to progress.

Besides scavenging, player can acquire clothings, weapons, tools, and other items using the crafting system.

To craft items, the player must have a sufficient amount of all required materials, with more advanced items requiring access to an appropriate workbench as well as a researched blueprint.

=== Survival ===
The game features basic survival mechanics such as survival, thirst, and temperature meters which must be maintained. There are other challenges the player must overcome during gameplay, such as drowning, hypothermia, and wildlife attacks—primarily bears, wolves and big cats. Specific locales around the map are radioactive, with four levels of radiation: minor, low, medium, and high. The correct armour or clothing must be worn to enter these areas; failure to do so can result in death.

Dying leaves behind the body with the entire inventory and equipped items. Players can then respawn at a random location, or at their designated spawn points (a sleeping bag or bed they own). Respawned characters only have a rock and torch.

=== Combat ===
Player vs player (PvP) combat is accomplished with bows, melee weapons and craftable guns. Bullets and other projectiles travel in a ballistic trajectory, rather than being hitscan. There are a number of different types of bullet for each gun, including high velocity and explosive, thus allowing for more diverse strategy. Hit tracking calculates damage; shots to the head are more damaging than shots to other parts of the body. The use of weapon attachments, such as holographic sights, provide an advantage over opponents.

Rust is sometimes played in a "clan". Clans usually create housing for their members, give items and supplies to each other and partake in organised raiding and looting.

Airdrops are an important element in Rust. These are parachute-equipped pallets of supplies delivered by a prop plane. They can be seen over extremely long distances, sometimes resulting in players running toward the airdrop. There are also other entities that drop advanced loot, including an attack helicopter and the CH-47 Chinook. Both of these travel randomly around the map and attempt to kill players. The Chinook additionally travels to a randomly picked monument found in the game world and drops a locked supply crate that opens after a length of time, inviting PvP interactions. In the game, players can visit safezones such as the outpost, bandit camp and fishing village to purchase supplies and vehicles, and make trades with other players in an area where hostile players are immediately killed by turrets.

== Development ==
A comparison of two different updates of Rust, the top (2014) one is the earlier of the two. The bottom (2016) used an updated game engine.

Rust's development began as a clone of DayZ, a popular survival mod for ARMA 2, featuring elements derived from Minecraft. Garry Newman, the CEO of Facepunch Studios, said "Rust started off as a DayZ clone. But then we decided that we are sick of fighting zombies. And can't compete with the Arma island in terms of landmarks and towns." Consequently, Newman described the game as being more along the lines of entries in the S.T.A.L.K.E.R series. Facepunch released the game onto the Steam Early Access program on 11 December 2013. Following its alpha launch, Facepunch actively released updates for Rust adding mechanics like animals, hunting, armour and weapons. In February 2014, the developers removed zombies, a temporary enemy, from Rust, replacing them with red mutant bears and wolves. Early on developers made the choice not to try to populate the world with interesting locations to explore, but rather provide the ability to create them. Newman described it as "we give them the tools, they make the world". One of the developers' aims was to create a world which does not encourage any particular kind of behaviour from players. They considered implementing a system like DayZ's where those who kill other players get unique outfits which identify them as 'bandits', or possibly a rating or colour-coded system. However, the developers ultimately rejected these ideas, believing they would detract from player freedom. Instead, they found to their surprise that the implementation of voice chat had a noticeable effect on player behaviour. With the ability to communicate, many players would no longer kill each other on sight out of fear.

In late 2014, developers released an experimental mode of Rust and ported it to a then-unreleased game engine, Unity 5, enhancing the graphics, and in turn, improving the shader mechanics and texture realism, as well as allowed for larger procedurally generated worlds. The experimental mode featured a new anti-cheat system called CheatPunch, which banned thousands of players within a few days. In October 2014, the experimental mode became the default launch option. Shortly after, in December, EasyAntiCheat, a third-party anti-cheat system, replaced CheatPunch. In early 2015, Rust added a feature that decided each player's skin colour based on their Steam ID.

In the original game, the heads-up display featured statistics like as health, hunger and radiation level. These were later modified and hidden statistics such as hypothermia were added. Monuments went through a phase where developers removed the radiation hazards because of the annoyance it was causing. Female models, added to the game shortly afterward, were initially only available for server administrators to test. Upon rollout, akin to skin colour, players were automatically assigned a sex permanently linked to their Steam account. Later in 2015, virtual goods stores selling guns, clothing and other objects were added to the game. When Valve introduced its Item Store, Rust was the first game on Steam to use the feature. The Steam Community Market was also allowed to sell similar items.

Developers removed blueprints, one of the core gameplay concepts of Rust, in July 2016. They replaced them with an experience system where players could level up after completing tasks, such as gathering wood. In September, Maurino Berry, the lead developer, mentioned in a Reddit post that the experience system was not permanent and Berry explained that the XP system was praised prior to its release, but then received a lot of criticism. In early November 2016, components replaced the experience system. Originally, players had an initial list of items they could craft. This was changed to having a complete list with the required components from the outset. Eventually, blueprints were reintroduced. Radiation, removed in 2015, was reintroduced in November 2016 after being "reprogrammed from the ground up". Instead of each location having the same level of radiation, developers added different levels ranging from low, to medium, and high.

In early 2017, Garry Newman said that had Steam Early Access not existed, Rust would have been fully released as a game by then. The development team would have continued to release updates. In June 2017, developers altered the game's gun mechanics to be more like "traditional first-person shooters". This was achieved by reducing recoil, material costs, and improving overall accuracy. This update also saw the beginnings of an overhaul of Hapis Island, the game's only non-procedurally generated map. The game left Early Access and was officially released on 8 February 2018, This update came with graphical updates and gun modifications. Newman mentioned that despite the official release, regular updates would continue. He noted the update cycle would change from weekly to monthly so as not to "rush in features and fixes that end up breaking something else".

=== Post-release ===
Since Rust's official release in 2018, Facepunch have continued to support the game with updates, including the introduction of new weapons, vehicles, NPC-populated locations, explorable areas, and graphical overhauls. Optional paid downloadable content has also been released. The first, the "Instruments Pack", which was released in December 2019, saw the addition of new instruments, and the second, the "Sunburn Pack", released in July 2020, added swimming pool equipment. In February 2021, Rust introduced a "softcore" mode. This mode was introduced after the game saw a surge in popularity as a result of various popular video game live streamers broadcasting the game to large audiences. Softcore mode lowered the difficulty of the game through the addition of various features that limited player loss and disadvantage, such as limiting the size of clans. A third DLC, the "Voice Props Pack", was made available in July 2021 which included audio-related devices, such as boomboxes and cassette recorders.

Console versions of Rust were first announced in 2019 by Facepunch and Double Eleven at X019, Microsoft's Xbox announcement event. The game was set for release in 2020, but in December 2020, the release date was pushed back to 2021 with Double Eleven citing the COVID-19 pandemic as having impeded development. In early March 2021, Rust's console edition entered a closed beta that players could participate in. However, no specific release date was given until later in March, when it was announced that the game would be released for PlayStation 4 and Xbox One on 21 May 2021. The developers noted that the release of a console version would not affect PC updates, and that the new version would be a "separate experience with its own roadmap and community". On 13 September 2023 Garry Newman announced works on Rust 2.

In April 2025, Double Eleven announced that they were working on a native version for PlayStation 5 and Xbox Series X/S. The release date was later announced in May, with the game launching for early access on 19 June 2025 and the full release on 26 June 2025. The PlayStation 4 and Xbox One versions of Rust were delisted from the PSN and Xbox storefronts on 29 May 2025, and online servers for these versions were shut down in October 2025.

== Reception ==
=== In early access ===
Rust received mixed reviews following its alpha release, with many denoting the unfinished nature and lack of polish. PC Gamer's Andy Chalk said Rust was a great use of Early Access and even though "it's far from finished", it was ready to be played. GameSpot's Shaun McInnis said the early 2014 version was "rough around the edges" and "littered with bugs", but it entertained and had potential. Matthew Cox of Rock, Paper, Shotgun said it was smart of the developers to switch to the Unity engine in late 2014 due to the game's instability. In Cox's review, he noted many glitches in the late 2014 version, including unresponsive animals, framerate issues and unstable servers. IGN's Mitch Dyer did not enjoy the combat, calling Rust a "semi-broken" game he felt unable to recommend. However, he complimented the experience as experience "utterly unforgettable" and often unpredictable.

Other games like Just Survive and Ark: Survival Evolved were compared to Rust because of their open world survival aspects, as well as having similar crafting mechanics. Parallels were also drawn with DayZ because of the influence it had on the gameplay of Rust. Notably, Kotaku's Luke Plunkett considered the similarities, saying it felt as though someone had intended to create a game whereby Dayz and Minecraft could be played simultaneously.

The inability to choose and design a player's character was both commended and criticised. The YouTube channel Extra Credits commended Rust for promoting diversity by randomly selecting a player's in-game race. Tying race to their Steam ID forced players to experience the game in a different way than they might normally experience it, perhaps promoting empathy for someone of a different ethnicity. David Craddock of Shacknews criticised the lack of communication between Facepunch and the community when they added female models. In response to this criticism, Garry Newman commented he felt some trepidation about adding the racial feature, fearing it might be seen as the original character model "blacked up". He stressed the chosen ethnicity was permanent—"just like in real life, you are who you are". Newman discussed the reasoning behind not providing the option to choose their character's gender and race in an article in The Guardian, saying Rust is about survival, not characterization and identity. "We wanted the appearance of the players to be consistent over time. They should be recognisable consistently and long-term." Sales reportedly increased by 74% shortly after the addition of female models.

=== Full release ===
Reception

Aggregate score
Aggregator	Score
Metacritic	PC: 69/100; PS4: 66/100; XONE: 64/100

Review scores
Publication	Score
Destructoid	8/10
Game Informer	6.5/10
GameSpot	3/10
GameStar	69/100
IGN	7/10
PC Gamer (US)	80/100

After being fully released, Rust garnered "mixed or average" reviews on review aggregator website Metacritic. Critics praised the PvP combat, difficulty, and survival aspects, while grinding and the experience had by new players came under some criticism.

Many critics held the opinion that while starting anew was frustrating, the combat was rewarding. For instance, Luke Winkie of PC Gamer summarised the game saying, "Wake up naked, run for your life, do horrible things to one another. There is no grander narrative, or mythos, or win condition." He described the beginner experience as "quite prickly" but continued on to praise the combat, joking that "connecting [a] hatchet with an idiot's head feels great". Gloria Manderfeld, a writer for the German magazine GameStar, echoed these opinions, adding there was little end-game besides PvP. However, she opined the PvP itself was effective. Ray Porreca of Destructoid described the combat as the "meat" of the game. However, he wrote that the experience would vary depending on their desire to fight. "If you can look past a community that tends to be toxic, Rust's sprawling plains and toppled landmarks are an excellent backdrop for player-driven storytelling and pitched, dramatic moments." In a negative review GameSpot's Alessandro Barbosa said the whole experience felt unfulfilling. He described the game as lacking certain creative features, like the ability to easily redesign bases.

The disdain toward the experience as a new player was noted in conjunction with the necessity of grinding, and how repetitive that became. IGN's review described the game as expecting the player to spend all their gaming time on it, fearing that failing to do so will result in being raided and needing to begin again. Game Informer's Javy Gwaltney reiterated this, explaining it felt demotivating when they died solely because they came in contact with someone more experienced. Agreeing with Manderfeld's description, in an updated review Cox said his patience wore thin after a while. He said that while maintaining health bars may have once been enjoyable, he balked at the prospect in 2018.

Nonetheless, some critics praised the game's difficulty, mentioning the satisfaction they felt after managing to survive successfully. Porreca recommended the game to those willing to dedicate time, saying the game offers "a social sandbox and a deep, functioning crafting system". Winkie expressed interest in the necessity of managing hunger, thirst, and health while learning more and discovering better items. He also expressed a sense of appreciation for those dedicated to the game, mentioning the YouTube videos of large, multi-clan raids. He closed the review saying everyone should try Rust due to its difference from other games. Cox agreed noting the game's brutality only added to the gratification a player felt when they managed to eventually succeed.

The reception toward the graphics were mixed. Critics praised the environment, but denounced the animations and character models. Barbosa described the animations as "stiff and unnatural" and the models "ugly and dull". Additionally, Rust's usage of sound was commended by Gwaltney, who regarded it as compelling due to the requirement of players to listen to their surroundings to survive.

Since Rust's release, it has been included in several "best survival game" lists by video game journalists.

=== Sales and player count ===
Within the first two weeks of Rust's alpha release it sold over 150,000 copies, compared to the 34,000 copies of Garry's Mod sold in its first week. Rust's sales had reached one million copies after being an Early Access title for only two months, and during February 2014, it overtook Garry's Mod in terms of sales, making over US$30 million. By the end of 2015, three million copies had been sold. By March 2017, the game had sold more than 5.2 million units, with more than 1.2 million in-game skins sold. In December 2019, Facepunch announced that Rust had sold 9 million copies, making $142 million, overtaking Garry's Mod in terms of gross, though still behind in total sales.

In January 2021, Rust saw a surge in popularity because of live streamers playing the game on Twitch.tv for large audiences. The game rose to the top of Twitch's charts, peaking at over one million concurrent live viewers on 3 January. The group primarily responsible for the high viewer counts was OfflineTV. This reinvigorated interest in the game enabled Rust to also beat its highest concurrent player count by more than double. Additionally, Newman reported that the game had generated $1 million in sales over two days during this period. At the end of 2021, Facepunch announced the game had reached almost 12.5 million sales. They also noted that the Voice Props Pack had been the most successful of the three DLC released at the time.
