= Source 2 =

Video game engine

- Developer: Valve
- Release: September 2015; 11 years ago
- Written in: C++
- Predecessor: Source
- License: Proprietary

Source 2 is a video game engine developed by Valve. The engine was announced in 2015 as the successor to the original Source engine, with the first game to use it, Dota 2, being ported from Source that same year. Other Valve games such as Artifact, Dota Underlords, Half-Life: Alyx, Counter-Strike 2, and Deadlock have been produced with the engine.

== History ==
Plans for a successor to the original Source engine began following the release of Half-Life 2: Episode Two in 2007. The first engine tech demo was created in 2010 by remaking a map from Left 4 Dead 2. Images of this were leaked onto the internet in early 2014. At the 2014 Game Developers Conference, Valve employee Sergiy Migdalskiy showed off a Source 2 physics debugging tool being used in Left 4 Dead 2. Source 2 was first made available via Steam Workshop tools for Dota 2 in 2014 prior to it being officially announced at the 2015 Game Developers Conference. There, Valve stated their intent for it was to allow for content to be created more efficiently. Valve also stated that it would support the Vulkan graphics API and use a new in-house physics engine called Rubikon, which would replace the need for the third-party Havok tools.

Gabe Newell, president and founder of Valve, said that the company were prioritizing the development of their own games before they would release the engine and its software development kit to the public. This was to ensure the highest quality for developers; he added that they were intending to make the engine free to use for game developers as long as the game is published on their Steam service.

In June 2015, Valve announced that the entirety of Dota 2 would be ported over to Source 2 in an update called Dota 2 Reborn. Reborn was first released to the public as an opt-in beta update that same month before officially replacing the original client in September 2015, making it the first game to use the engine. Source 2 has also been used for Valve's Artifact and Dota Underlords, with the engine later being supported on Android and iOS for the latter. The engine also supports the creation of games in virtual reality, being used in SteamVR Home, the Robot Repair tech demo within The Lab, and Half-Life: Alyx. Source 2 tools made specifically for creating content for Half-Life: Alyx were released in May 2020.

== Games ==
Year	Game	Developer	Note(s)
2015	Dota 2	Valve	Ported from Source; originally released in 2013
2016	Robot Repair	Valve	Tech demo included within The Lab
2018	Artifact	Valve	
2020	Dota Underlords	Valve	Released in early access in 2019
2020	Half-Life: Alyx	Valve	Made for virtual reality headsets
2022	Aperture Desk Job	Valve	Tech demo created for the Steam Deck
2023	Counter-Strike 2	Valve	Successor to Counter-Strike: Global Offensive (2012)
2026	S&box	Facepunch Studios	Pronounced "sandbox"; open-source development platform
TBA	Deadlock	Valve	Beta testing began in 2024
