= The Game Awards 2021 =

American video game awards

- Date: December 9, 2021
- Venue: Microsoft Theater, Los Angeles
- Country: United States
- Hosted by: Geoff Keighley
- Preshow host: Sydnee Goodman

Highlights
- Most awards: Forza Horizon 5; It Takes Two (3)
- Most nominations: Deathloop (9)
- Game of the Year: It Takes Two
- Website: thegameawards.com

Online coverage
- Runtime: 3 hours, 12 minutes
- Viewership: 85 million
- Produced by: Geoff Keighley; Kimmie Kim
- Directed by: Richard Preuss

The Game Awards 2021 was an award show that honored the best video games of 2021. The event was hosted by Geoff Keighley, creator and producer of The Game Awards, and was held to an invited audience at the Microsoft Theater in Los Angeles on December 9, 2021. The preshow ceremony was hosted by Sydnee Goodman. The event was live streamed across more than 40 digital platforms. It featured musical performances from Imagine Dragons, JID, Darren Korb, and Sting, and presentations from celebrity guests including Reggie Fils-Aimé, Keanu Reeves, Ben Schwartz, and Ming-Na Wen. Activision Blizzard was excluded from the show outside of its nominated games after the company was sued by the California Department of Fair Employment and Housing on allegations of sexual harassment and employee discrimination in July 2021; Keighley's comments about the company received some criticism.

Deathloop led the show with nine nominations; it won Best Game Direction and Best Art Direction. Forza Horizon 5 and It Takes Two tied for the most wins with three awards, and the latter won Game of the Year. Marvel's Guardians of the Galaxy was awarded Best Narrative, and Maggie Robertson won Best Performance for her role as Lady Dimitrescu in Resident Evil Village. Several new games were announced during the show, including Alan Wake II, The Expanse: A Telltale Series, and Sonic Frontiers, and the first full trailers for Halo and Sonic the Hedgehog 2 premiered. The show was viewed by over 85 million streams, the most in its history to date. (Note: The viewership record was beaten in 2022 with 103 million streams.) It received mixed reviews, with some praise directed at new game announcements and criticism for its length and focus on announcements over awards.

== Background ==
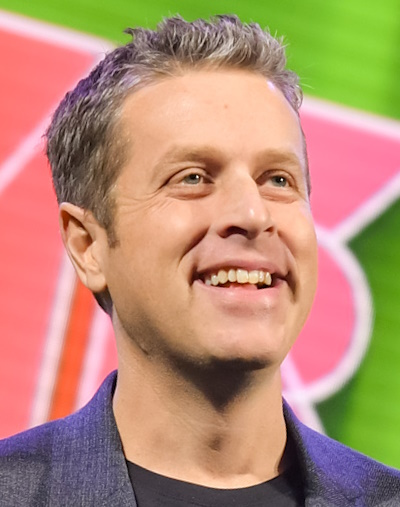
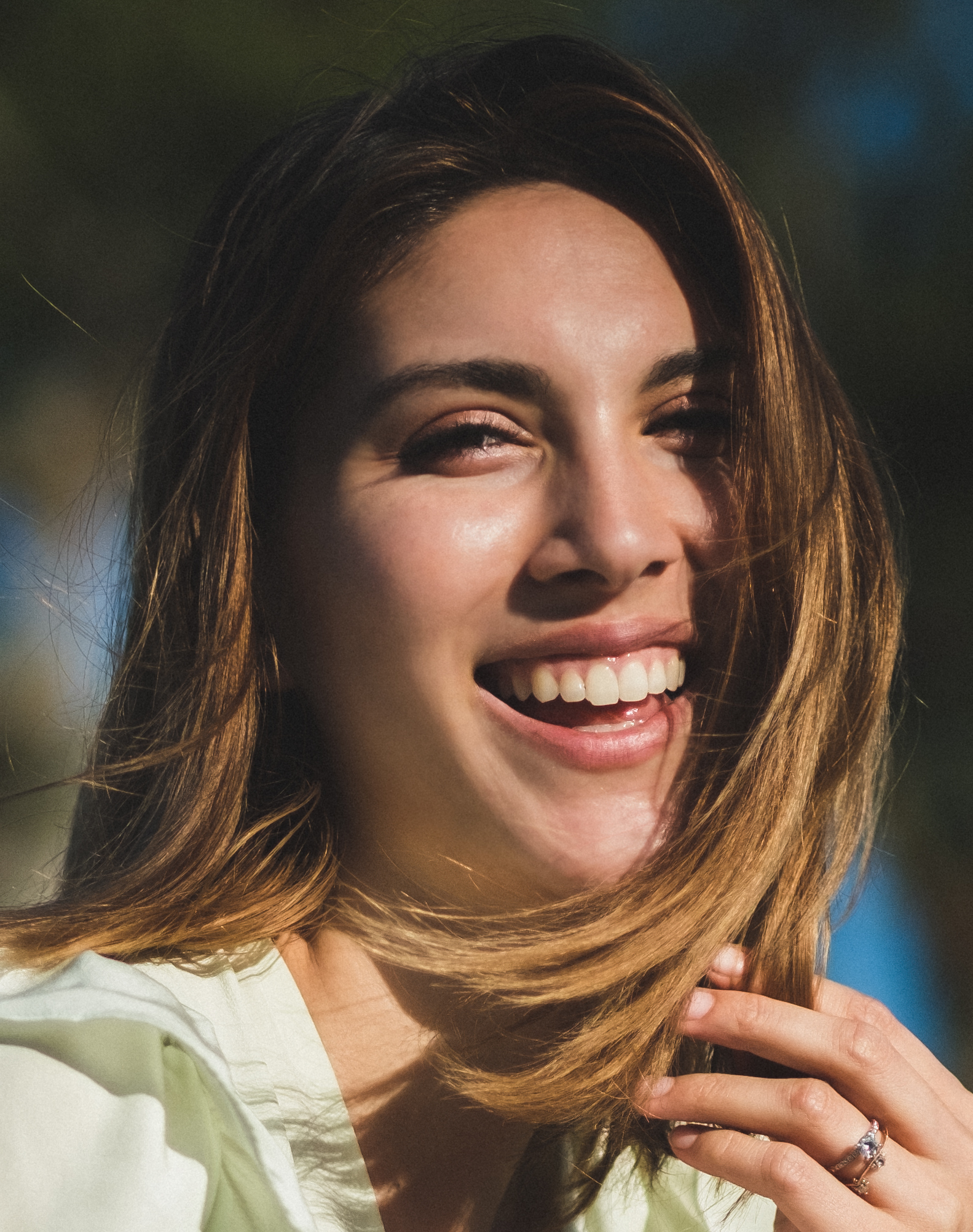
As with previous iterations of The Game Awards, Geoff Keighley (left) hosted the main show while Sydnee Goodman (right) hosted the preshow.

As with previous iterations of The Game Awards, the show was hosted and produced by Canadian games journalist Geoff Keighley; the 30-minute preshow was hosted by Sydnee Goodman. Following the success of The Game Awards 2020—which was broadcast virtually due to the COVID-19 pandemic—Keighley received suggestions to follow the same format; around mid-2021, he decided the show would return to an in-person event at the Microsoft Theater in Los Angeles as he "really missed the energy of people accepting their awards live and the reactions". Several safety protocols were put in place, including halving live attendance, mandating vaccines, and requiring face masks; contingency plans were also established in case of unexpected COVID-19 variants or other issues. Keighley noted an excitement to return to the in-person event, stating it was the first time in two years the industry was able to gather.

The Game Awards partnered with Spotify to produce a four-episode podcast titled Inside the Game Awards, hosted by Keighley and featuring IGN's Tina Amini, Giant Bomb's Jeff Gerstmann, and The Guardian's Keza MacDonald; it was released weekly from November 22, 2021, with episodes focusing on the history of the show and musical performances, the 2021 nominees, and a post-show recap. The Game Awards 2021 was the second show to feature Future Class, a list of individuals from across the video game industry who best represent the future of video games; the inductees included industry professionals such as Capybara Games producer Farah Coculuzzi, Xbox social marketing manager Hailey Geller, Gayming Magazine editor-in-chief Aimee Hart, disability rights activist Amy Kavanagh, and Deck Nine Games narrative director Felice Kuan.

The show was executive produced by Keighley and Kimmie Kim, with LeRoy Bennett serving as creative director and Richard Preuss as director. The presentation was aired on December 9, 2021, live streamed across more than 40 online platforms. The show partnered with Nodwin Gaming for distribution in India, where it was broadcast on platforms such as Disney+, Jio TV, MTV India, MX Player, and Voot. It was available to watch in the interactive environment of Axial Tilt, built within the video game Core; players could interact with the red carpet before the event and a virtual party after it. Several days before the show, Alice O'Connor of Rock, Paper, Shotgun described the experience as "dead boring", which she said "seems perfectly fitting" for The Game Awards.

=== Relationship with Activision Blizzard ===
Keighley said he was reevaluating the show's relationship with Activision Blizzard after the company was sued by the California Department of Fair Employment and Housing on allegations of sexual harassment and employee discrimination in July 2021, adding he wanted the show to support employees and developers without diminishing individual achievements; Kotaku's Ethan Gach characterized Keighley's statement as a refusal to "take sides", and noted the show's advisory board included Activision president Rob Kostich. After some criticism, Keighley stated Activision Blizzard would not be part of the ceremony outside of its nominated games, and wrote the show was committed to "work together to build a better and a more inclusive environment".

Before the event, some Activision Blizzard employees and supporters stood outside the Microsoft Theater in protest of the company's recent laying off of around 20 workers at subsidiary company Raven Software. Early in the show, Keighley denounced abuse in the industry; Kotaku's Gach criticized Keighley's statement, noting he did not refer to Activision Blizzard by name and his statement failed to "meaningfully expand" on his promised commitments, and PC Gamer's Rich Stanton described it as a "statement you expect from a producer who doesn't want to take any position that will threaten valuable industry relationships". Stanton and Bloomberg News's Jason Schreier identified the hypocrisy of following up Keighley's statement with the announcement of a game by Quantic Dream, a studio accused of a hostile workplace culture of racism, sexism, and misconduct. Keighley stated he wanted to ensure that spreading a message was balanced with the show's upbeat nature; he said using its platform to reprimand poor behavior is "always something worth thinking about, but it's not a referendum on the industry".

=== Announcements ===
Sonic Frontiers was announced at the Game Awards 2021 alongside its first trailer.

According to Keighley, the show featured around 50 games, with new announcements "probably in the double digits"; he later claimed there would be six major reveals and several film trailers. He said it was a busy year for announcement pitches, noting the show's popularity and accessibility meant more developers and publishers sought involvement. Keighley claimed some studios had specific requests for the placement of their announcements within the show, but he decided about a month prior to allow for all submissions. He felt some of the game announcements were taking advantage of the new generation of consoles for the first time. Keighley noted the show would attempt to include related media, including television shows and films; the first full trailers for the television series Halo and film Sonic the Hedgehog 2 premiered during the show. Keighley described the show as "half an awards show and half a look into the future". Announcements on released and upcoming games were made for:

- A Plague Tale: Requiem
- Babylon's Fall
- Chivalry II
- Cuphead: The Delicious Last Course
- Destiny 2: The Witch Queen
- Elden Ring
- Evil West
- Fall Guys
- Final Fantasy VII Remake Intergrade
- Forspoken
- Genshin Impact
- Homeworld 3
- Horizon Forbidden West
- The King of Fighters XV
- Lost Ark
- The Matrix Awakens
- Monster Hunter Rise
- Persona 4 Arena Ultimax
- Planet of Lana
- Senua's Saga: Hellblade II
- Somerville
- Suicide Squad: Kill the Justice League
- Tchia
- Tunic
- Warhammer: Vermintide 2

New games announced during the ceremony included:

- Alan Wake II
- Among Us VR
- ARC Raiders
- Dune: Spice Wars
- The Expanse: A Telltale Series
- Have a Nice Death
- Nightingale
- Rumbleverse
- Slitterhead
- Sonic Frontiers
- Star Trek: Resurgence
- Star Wars Eclipse
- The Texas Chainsaw Massacre
- Thirsty Suitors
- Warhammer 40,000: Space Marine 2
- Wonder Woman

== Winners and nominees ==
Nominees were announced on November 16, 2021. Any game released for public consumption on or before November 19, 2021, was eligible for consideration. The nominees were compiled by a jury panel composed of members from 103 media outlets globally. Winners were determined between the jury (90 percent) and public voting (10 percent); the latter was held via the official website and on social media platforms such as Facebook, Twitter, and Bilibili until December 8. The exception is the Players' Voice award, fully nominated and voted-on by the public; the winner was announced on December 8 after three rounds of voting. Specialized juries decided the nominees and winners for categories such as accessibility and esports. Voting for the best esports team category was also held through the show's Discord server and through direct messages on Twitter. More than 23.2 million votes were submitted on the official website, a 27 percent increase over the previous year.

Keighley found his ownership of the show led to him receiving blame for snubs in nominations, despite not being involved in the voting process. Regarding potential winners, Keighley felt "it's kind of anyone's game this year" but, as the show's producer, he prefers shows like The Game Awards 2018 with the rivalry between God of War and Red Dead Redemption 2. He noted future shows could see the addition of awards for adaptations and user-generated content, but felt "there's just not enough yet".

=== Awards ===
Winners are listed first, highlighted in boldface, and indicated with a double dagger (‡).

==== Video games ====
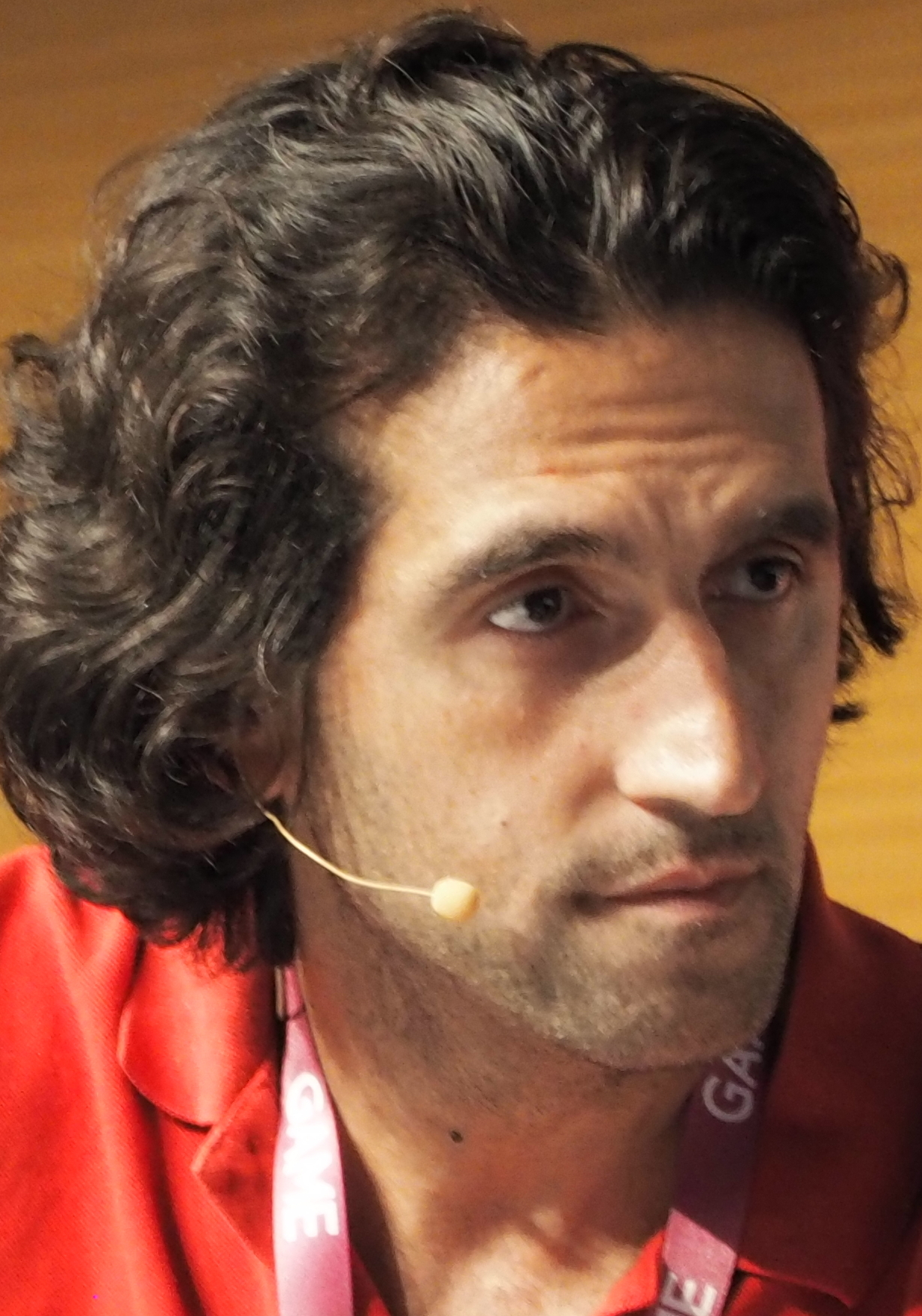
Josef Fares, game director of It Takes Two, accepted the show's Game of the Year award.

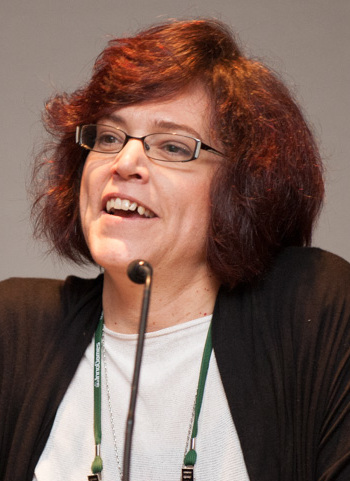
Mary DeMarle won the award for Best Narrative for Marvel's Guardians of the Galaxy, alongside Jean-François Dugas.

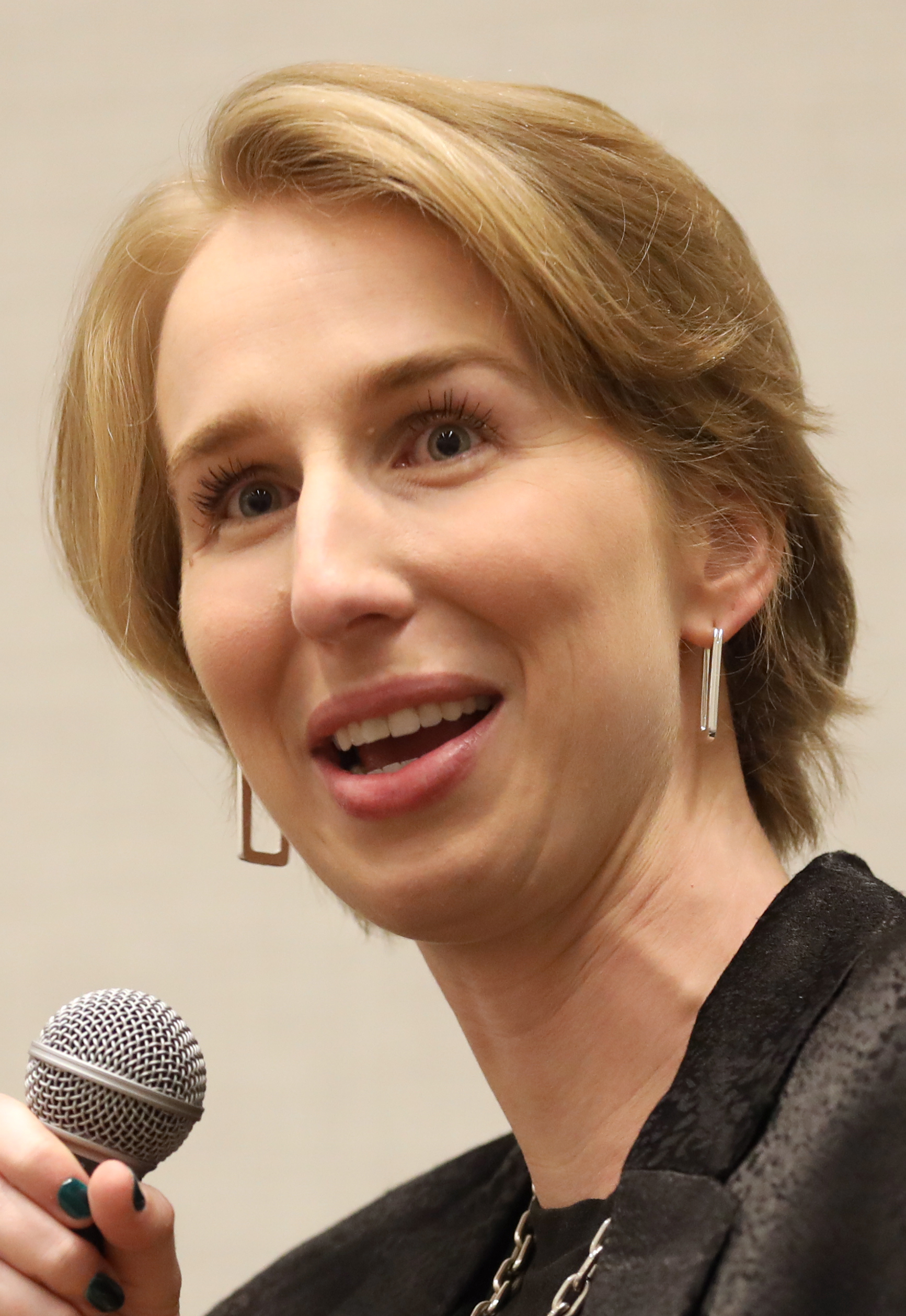
Maggie Robertson won Best Performance for her role as Lady Dimitrescu in Resident Evil Village.

| Game of the Year | Best Game Direction |
|---|---|
| **It Takes Two – Hazelight Studios / Electronic Arts**‡; Deathloop – Arkane Studios / Bethesda Softworks; Metroid Dread – MercurySteam / Nintendo; Psychonauts 2 – Double Fine / Xbox Game Studios; Ratchet & Clank: Rift Apart – Insomniac Games / Sony Interactive Entertainment; Resident Evil Village – Capcom | **Deathloop – Arkane Studios / Bethesda Softworks**‡; It Takes Two – Hazelight Studios / Electronic Arts; Psychonauts 2 – Double Fine / Xbox Game Studios; Ratchet & Clank: Rift Apart – Insomniac Games / Sony Interactive Entertainment; Returnal – Housemarque / Sony Interactive Entertainment |
| Best Narrative | Best Art Direction |
| **Marvel's Guardians of the Galaxy – Eidos Montreal / Square Enix**‡; Deathloop – Arkane Studios / Bethesda Softworks; It Takes Two – Hazelight Studios / Electronic Arts; Life Is Strange: True Colors – Deck Nine / Square Enix; Psychonauts 2 – Double Fine / Xbox Game Studios | **Deathloop – Arkane Studios / Bethesda Softworks**‡; Kena: Bridge of Spirits – Ember Lab; Psychonauts 2 – Double Fine / Xbox Game Studios; Ratchet & Clank: Rift Apart – Insomniac Games / Sony Interactive Entertainment; The Artful Escape – Beethoven & Dinosaur / Annapurna Interactive |
| Best Score and Music | Best Audio Design |
| **Nier Replicant ver 1.22474487139 – Keiichi Okabe**‡; Cyberpunk 2077 – Marcin Przybyłowicz and Piotr T. Adamczyk; Deathloop – Tom Salta; Marvel's Guardians of the Galaxy – Richard Jacques; The Artful Escape – Johnny Galvatron and Josh Abrahams | **Forza Horizon 5 – Playground Games / Xbox Game Studios**‡; Deathloop – Arkane Studios / Bethesda Softworks; Ratchet & Clank: Rift Apart – Insomniac Games / Sony Interactive Entertainment; Resident Evil Village – Capcom; Returnal – Housemarque / Sony Interactive Entertainment |
| Best Performance | Games for Impact |
| **Maggie Robertson as Lady Dimitrescu – Resident Evil Village**‡; Erika Mori as Alex Chen – Life Is Strange: True Colors; Giancarlo Esposito as Antón Castillo – Far Cry 6; Jason E. Kelley as Colt Vahn – Deathloop; Ozioma Akagha as Juliana Blake – Deathloop | **Life Is Strange: True Colors – Deck Nine / Square Enix**‡; Before Your Eyes – GoodbyeWorld Games / Skybound Games; Boyfriend Dungeon – Kitfox Games; Chicory: A Colorful Tale – Greg Lobanov / Finji; No Longer Home – Humble Grove / Fellow Traveller |
| Best Ongoing Game | Best Independent Game |
| **Final Fantasy XIV – Square Enix**‡; Apex Legends – Respawn Entertainment / Electronic Arts; Call of Duty: Warzone – Raven Software / Activision; Fortnite – Epic Games; Genshin Impact – miHoYo | **Kena: Bridge of Spirits – Ember Lab**‡; 12 Minutes – Luís António / Annapurna Interactive; Death's Door – Acid Nerve / Devolver Digital; Inscryption – Daniel Mullins Games / Devolver Digital; Loop Hero – Four Quarters / Devolver Digital |
| Best Mobile Game | Best Community Support |
| **Genshin Impact – miHoYo**‡; Fantasian – Mistwalker; League of Legends: Wild Rift – Riot Games; Marvel Future Revolution – Netmarble / Marvel Games; Pokémon Unite – TiMi Studio / The Pokémon Company | **Final Fantasy XIV – Square Enix**‡; Apex Legends – Respawn Entertainment / Electronic Arts; Destiny 2: Beyond Light – Bungie; Fortnite – Epic Games; No Man's Sky – Hello Games |
| Best VR / AR Game | Innovation in Accessibility |
| **Resident Evil 4 – Armature Studio / Capcom / Oculus Studios**‡; Hitman 3 – IO Interactive; I Expect You to Die 2: The Spy and the Liar – Schell Games; Lone Echo II – Ready at Dawn / Oculus Studios; Sniper Elite VR – Coatsink / Just Add Water / Rebellion Developments | **Forza Horizon 5 – Playground Games / Xbox Game Studios**‡; Far Cry 6 – Ubisoft; Marvel's Guardians of the Galaxy – Eidos Montreal / Square Enix; Ratchet & Clank: Rift Apart – Insomniac Games / Sony Interactive Entertainment; The Vale: Shadow of the Crown – Falling Squirrel |
| Best Action Game | Best Action / Adventure Game |
| **Returnal – Housemarque / Sony Interactive Entertainment**‡; Back 4 Blood – Turtle Rock Studios / WB Games; Chivalry II – Torn Banner Studios / Tripwire Interactive; Deathloop – Arkane Studios / Bethesda Softworks; Far Cry 6 – Ubisoft | **Metroid Dread – MercurySteam / Nintendo**‡; Marvel's Guardians of the Galaxy – Eidos Montreal / Square Enix; Psychonauts 2 – Double Fine / Xbox Game Studios; Ratchet & Clank: Rift Apart – Insomniac Games / Sony Interactive Entertainment; Resident Evil Village – Capcom |
| Best Role Playing Game | Best Fighting Game |
| **Tales of Arise – Bandai Namco Studios / Bandai Namco Entertainment**‡; Cyberpunk 2077 – CD Projekt RED; Monster Hunter Rise – Capcom; Scarlet Nexus – Bandai Namco Studios / Tose / Bandai Namco; Shin Megami Tensei V – Atlus / Sega | **Guilty Gear Strive – Arc System Works**‡; Demon Slayer: Kimetsu no Yaiba – The Hinokami Chronicles – CyberConnect2 / Sega; Melty Blood: Type Lumina – French Bread / Delightworks; Nickelodeon All-Star Brawl – Ludosity / Fair Play Labs / GameMill Entertainment; Virtua Fighter 5: Ultimate Showdown – Sega |
| Best Family Game | Best Sports / Racing Game |
| **It Takes Two – Hazelight Studios / Electronic Arts**‡; Mario Party Superstars – NDcube / Nintendo; New Pokémon Snap – Bandai Namco Studios / The Pokémon Company; Super Mario 3D World + Bowser's Fury – Nintendo; WarioWare: Get It Together! – Nintendo | **Forza Horizon 5 – Playground Games / Xbox Game Studios**‡; F1 2021 – Codemasters / EA Sports; FIFA 22 – EA Vancouver / EA Sports; Hot Wheels Unleashed – Milestone; Riders Republic – Ubisoft |
| Best Sim / Strategy Game | Best Multiplayer Game |
| **Age of Empires IV – Relic Entertainment / Xbox Game Studios**‡; Evil Genius 2: World Domination – Rebellion Developments; Humankind – Amplitude Studios / Sega; Inscryption – Daniel Mullins Games / Devolver Digital; Microsoft Flight Simulator – Asobo Studio / Xbox Game Studios | **It Takes Two – Hazelight Studios / Electronic Arts**‡; Back 4 Blood – Turtle Rock Studios / WB Games; Knockout City – Velan Studios / Electronic Arts; Monster Hunter Rise – Capcom; New World – Amazon Games; Valheim – Iron Gate Studio / Coffee Stain Studios |
| Best Debut Indie Game | Most Anticipated Game |
| **Kena: Bridge of Spirits – Ember Lab**‡; Sable – Shedworks / Raw Fury; The Artful Escape – Beethoven & Dinosaur / Annapurna Interactive; The Forgotten City – Modern Storyteller / Dear Villager; Valheim – Iron Gate Studio / Coffee Stain Studios | **Elden Ring – FromSoftware / Bandai Namco**‡; God of War Ragnarök – Santa Monica Studio / Sony Interactive Entertainment; Horizon Forbidden West – Guerrilla Games / Sony Interactive Entertainment; The Legend of Zelda: Breath of the Wild sequel – Nintendo; Starfield – Bethesda Game Studios / Bethesda Softworks |
Players' Voice (Note: 100 percent public-voted award with a three-round nomination process that began with 30 games)
**Halo Infinite – 343 Industries / Xbox Game Studios**‡; Forza Horizon 5 – Playground Games / Xbox Game Studios; It Takes Two – Hazelight Studios / Electronic Arts; Metroid Dread – MercurySteam / Nintendo; Resident Evil Village – Capcom

==== Esports and creators ====
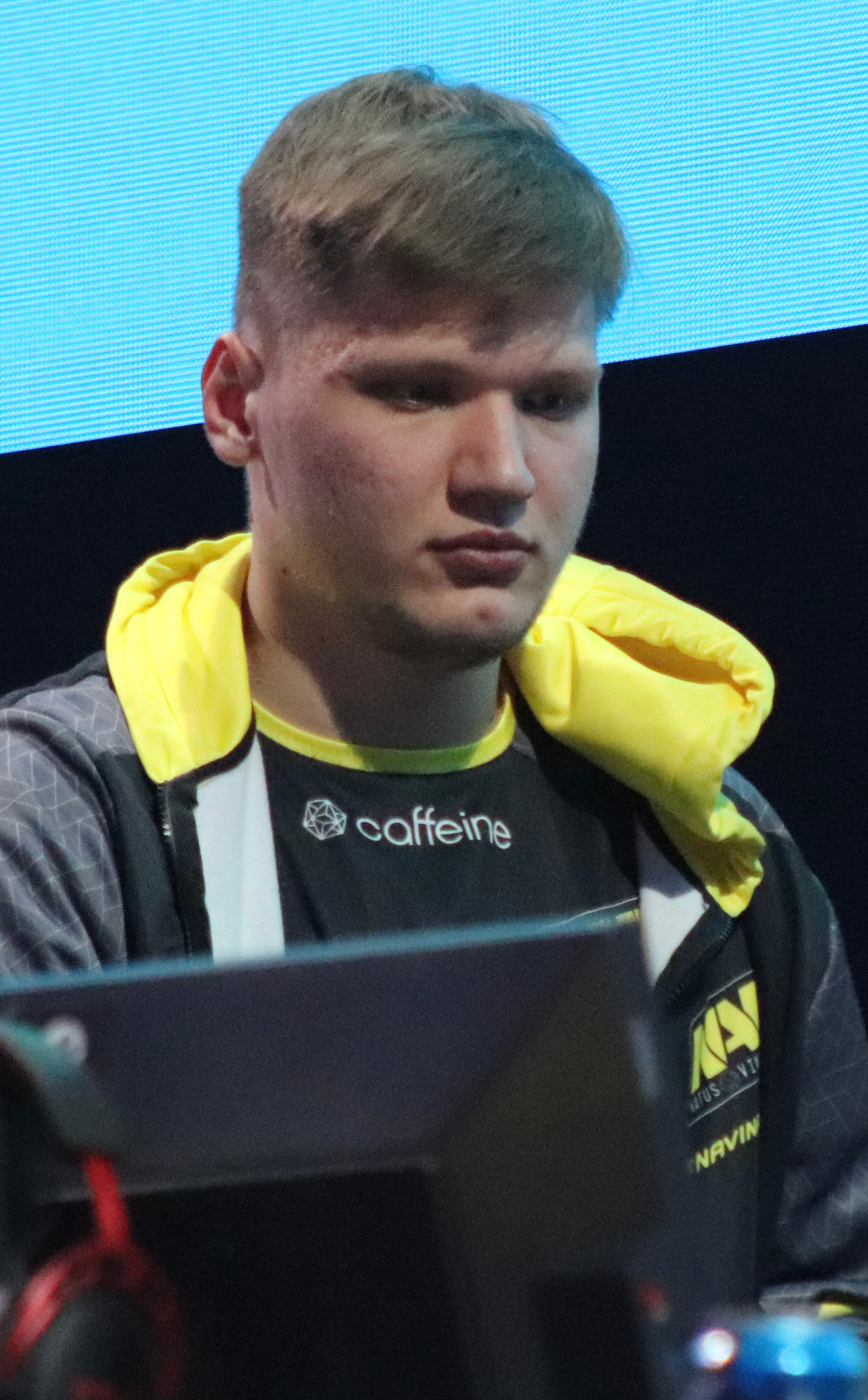
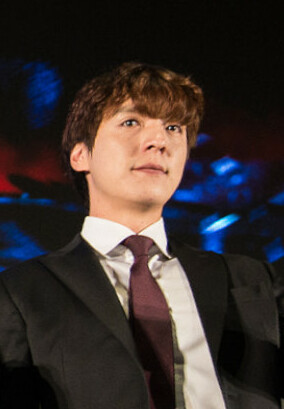
s1mple (left) and kkOma (right) won Best Esports Player and Best Esports Coach, respectively.
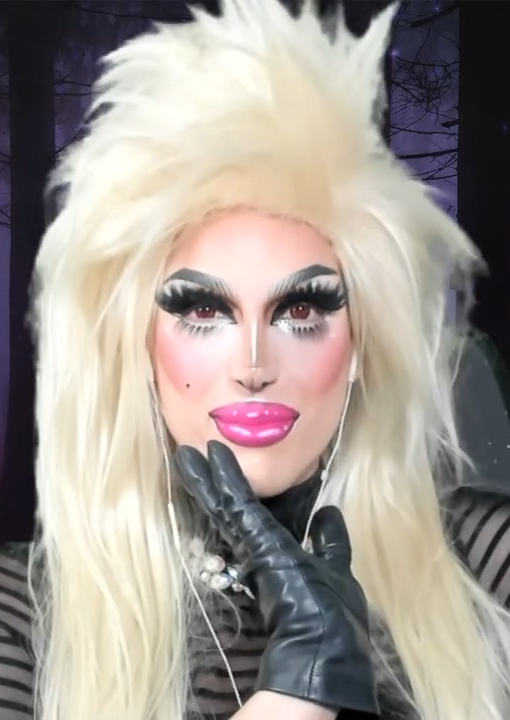
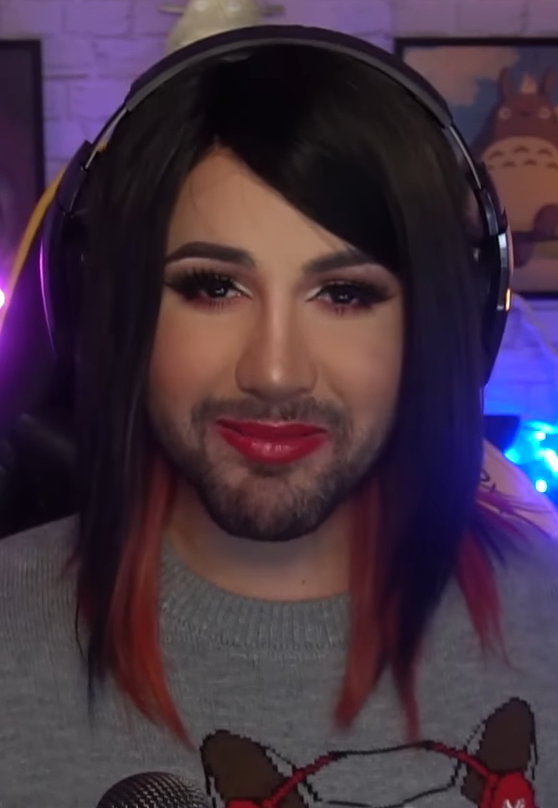
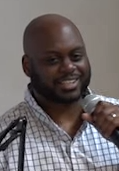
Deere, Samira Close, and Kahlief Adams (left to right) were named Global Gaming Citizens alongside Anisa Sanusi.

| Best Esports Game | Best Esports Player |
|---|---|
| **League of Legends – Riot Games**‡; Call of Duty – Activision; Counter-Strike: Global Offensive – Valve; Dota 2 – Valve; Valorant – Riot Games | **Oleksandr "s1mple" Kostyliev**‡; Chris "Simp" Lehr; Heo "ShowMaker" Su; Magomed "Collapse" Khalilov; Tyson "TenZ" Ngo |
| Best Esports Team | Best Esports Coach |
| **Natus Vincere (Counter Strike: Global Offensive)**‡; DAMWON KIA (League of Legends); Atlanta FaZe (Call of Duty); Sentinels (Valorant); Team Spirit (Dota 2) | **Kim "kkOma" Jeong-gyun**‡; Airat "Silent" Gaziev; Andrey "Engh" Sholokhov; Andrei "B1ad3" Horodenskyi; James "Crowder" Crowder |
| Best Esports Event | Content Creator of the Year |
| **2021 League of Legends World Championship**‡; The International 10; PGL Major Stockholm 2021; PUBG Mobile Global Championship 2020; 2021 Valorant Champions Tour: Stage 2 Masters | **Dream**‡; Leslie "Fuslie" Fu; Alexandre "Gaules" Borba; Ibai Llanos; David "TheGrefg" Cánovas |
Global Gaming Citizens (Note: Presented in conjunction with Facebook Gaming)
**The Drag Stream Community**; **Deere**; **Samira Close**; **Kahlief Adams** (Spawn on Me); **Anisa Sanusi** (Limit Break)

=== Games with multiple nominations and awards ===
==== Multiple nominations ====
Deathloop received the most nominations with nine. Other games with multiple nominations included It Takes Two and Ratchet & Clank: Rift Apart with six, and Psychonauts 2 and Resident Evil Village with five. Xbox Game Studios (Note: Deathloop was published by Bethesda Softworks independently of Xbox Game Studios, its indirect parent company.) led the publishers with thirteen nominations, followed by Sony Interactive Entertainment and Electronic Arts with eleven, and Bethesda Softworks and Square Enix with ten.

Games that received multiple nominations
| Nominations | Game |
|---|---|
| 9 | Deathloop |
| 6 | It Takes Two |
| 6 | Ratchet & Clank: Rift Apart |
| 5 | Psychonauts 2 |
| 5 | Resident Evil Village |
| 4 | Forza Horizon 5 |
| 4 | Marvel's Guardians of the Galaxy |
| 3 | The Artful Escape |
| 3 | Far Cry 6 |
| 3 | Kena: Bridge of Spirits |
| 3 | Life Is Strange: True Colors |
| 3 | Metroid Dread |
| 3 | Returnal |
| 2 | Apex Legends |
| 2 | Back 4 Blood |
| 2 | Cyberpunk 2077 |
| 2 | Final Fantasy XIV |
| 2 | Fortnite |
| 2 | Genshin Impact |
| 2 | Inscryption |
| 2 | Monster Hunter Rise |
| 2 | Valheim |

Nominations by publisher
| Nominations | Publisher |
|---|---|
| 13 | Xbox Game Studios |
| 11 | Electronic Arts |
| 11 | Sony Interactive Entertainment |
| 10 | Bethesda Softworks |
| 10 | Square Enix |
| 8 | Capcom |
| 7 | Nintendo |
| 4 | Annapurna Interactive |
| 4 | Devolver Digital |
| 4 | Sega |
| 4 | Ubisoft |
| 3 | Bandai Namco |
| 3 | Ember Lab |
| 3 | Riot Games |
| 2 | Activision |
| 2 | CD Projekt |
| 2 | Coffee Stain Studios |
| 2 | Epic Games |
| 2 | miHoYo |
| 2 | The Pokémon Company |
| 2 | Valve |
| 2 | WB Games |

==== Multiple awards ====
Forza Horizon 5 and It Takes Two led the show with three wins each, followed by Deathloop, Final Fantasy XIV, and Kena: Bridge of Spirits with two awards each. Square Enix and Xbox Game Studios won a total of five awards each, while Electronic Arts won three.

Games that received multiple wins
| Awards | Game |
|---|---|
| 3 | Forza Horizon 5 |
| 3 | It Takes Two |
| 2 | Deathloop |
| 2 | Final Fantasy XIV |
| 2 | Kena: Bridge of Spirits |

Wins by publisher
| Awards | Publisher |
|---|---|
| 5 | Square Enix |
| 5 | Xbox Game Studios |
| 3 | Electronic Arts |
| 2 | Bandai Namco |
| 2 | Bethesda Softworks |
| 2 | Ember Lab |

== Presenters and performers ==
=== Presenters ===
The following individuals, listed in order of appearance, presented awards or introduced trailers. All other awards were presented by Keighley or Goodman.

| Name | Role |
|---|---|
| Giancarlo Esposito | Presented the award for Best Independent Game |
| Laura Bailey | Presented the award for Best Performance |
| Ashley Johnson | Presented the award for Best Performance |
| Sam Lake | Presented the announcement trailer for Alan Wake II |
| Ben Schwartz | Presented the trailer for Sonic the Hedgehog 2 |
| Simu Liu | Presented the award for Best Action Game |
| Aaryn Flynn | Presented the announcement trailer for Nightingale |
| Hideo Kojima | Presented the trailer for Nightmare Alley |
| Guillermo del Toro | Presented the award for Best Art Direction |
| Aerial Powers | Presented the award for Best Mobile Game |
| Ming-Na Wen | Presented the award for Best Narrative |
| Debra Wilson | Presented the gameplay trailer for Suicide Squad: Kill the Justice League |
| Ella Balinska | Presented the trailer for Forspoken |
| Pollyanna McIntosh | Presented the trailer for Forspoken |
| Clive Standen | Presented the announcement trailer for Warhammer 40,000: Space Marine 2 |
| Tim Willits | Presented the announcement trailer for Warhammer 40,000: Space Marine 2 |
| Paul George | Presented the award for Best Action/Adventure Game |
| Will Arnett | Presented the trailer for Tiny Tina's Wonderlands |
| Ashly Burch | Presented the trailer for Tiny Tina's Wonderlands |
| Reggie Fils-Aimé | Presented the award for Best Ongoing Game |
| Morgan Baker | Presented the award for Innovation in Accessibility |
| Jacksepticeye | Presented the award for Innovation in Accessibility |
| Simon Viklund | Presented the release trailer for GTFO |
| Donald Mustard | Presented the award for Best Game Direction |
| Carrie-Anne Moss | Presented the reveal trailer for The Matrix Awakens |
| Keanu Reeves | Presented the reveal trailer for The Matrix Awakens |
| Neil Druckmann | Presented the award for Game of the Year |

=== Performers ===
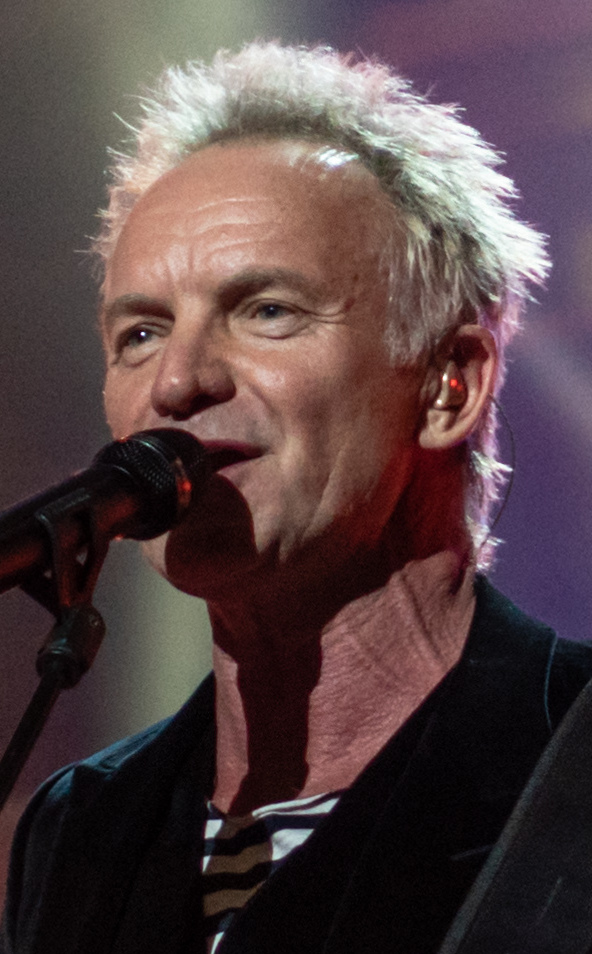
Sting

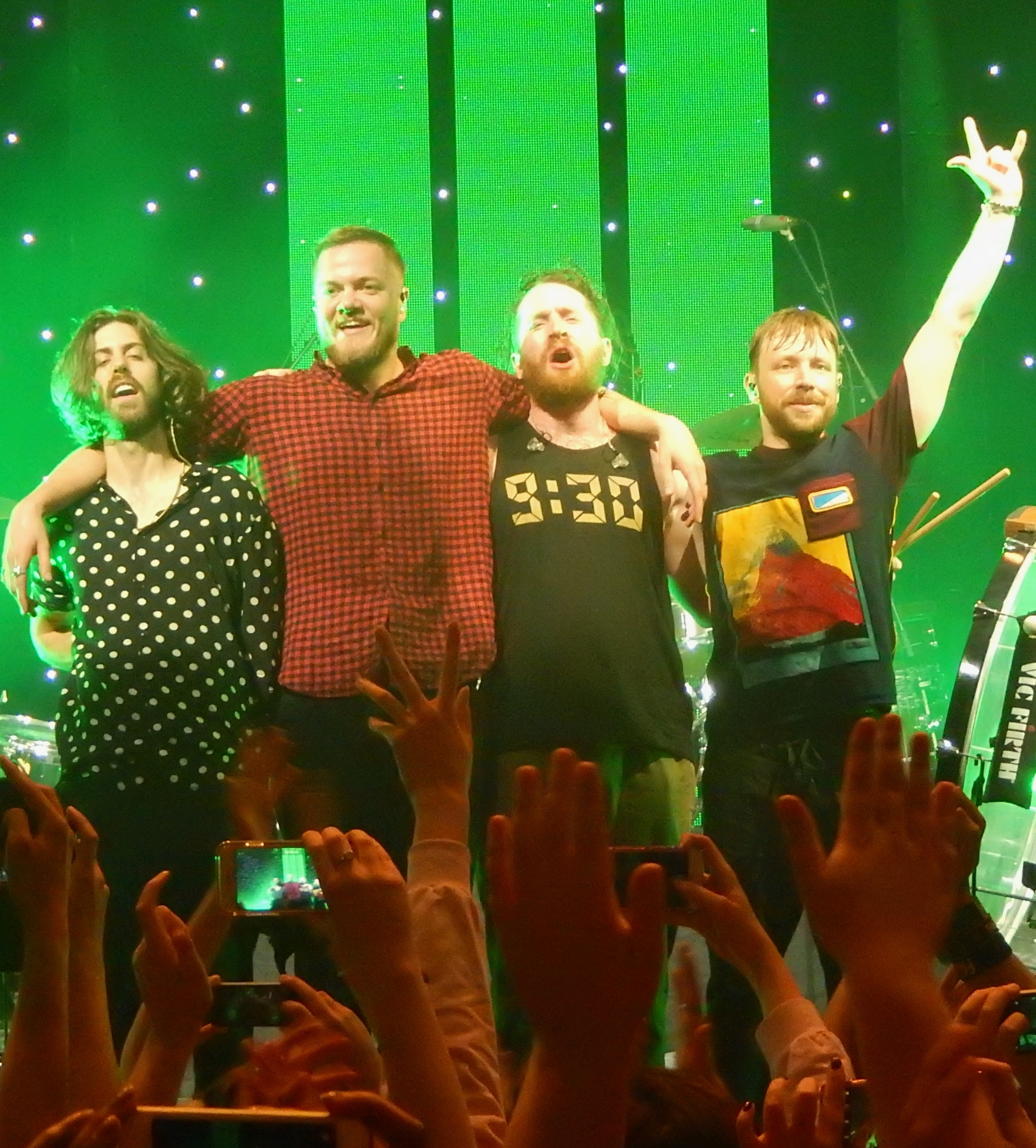
Imagine Dragons

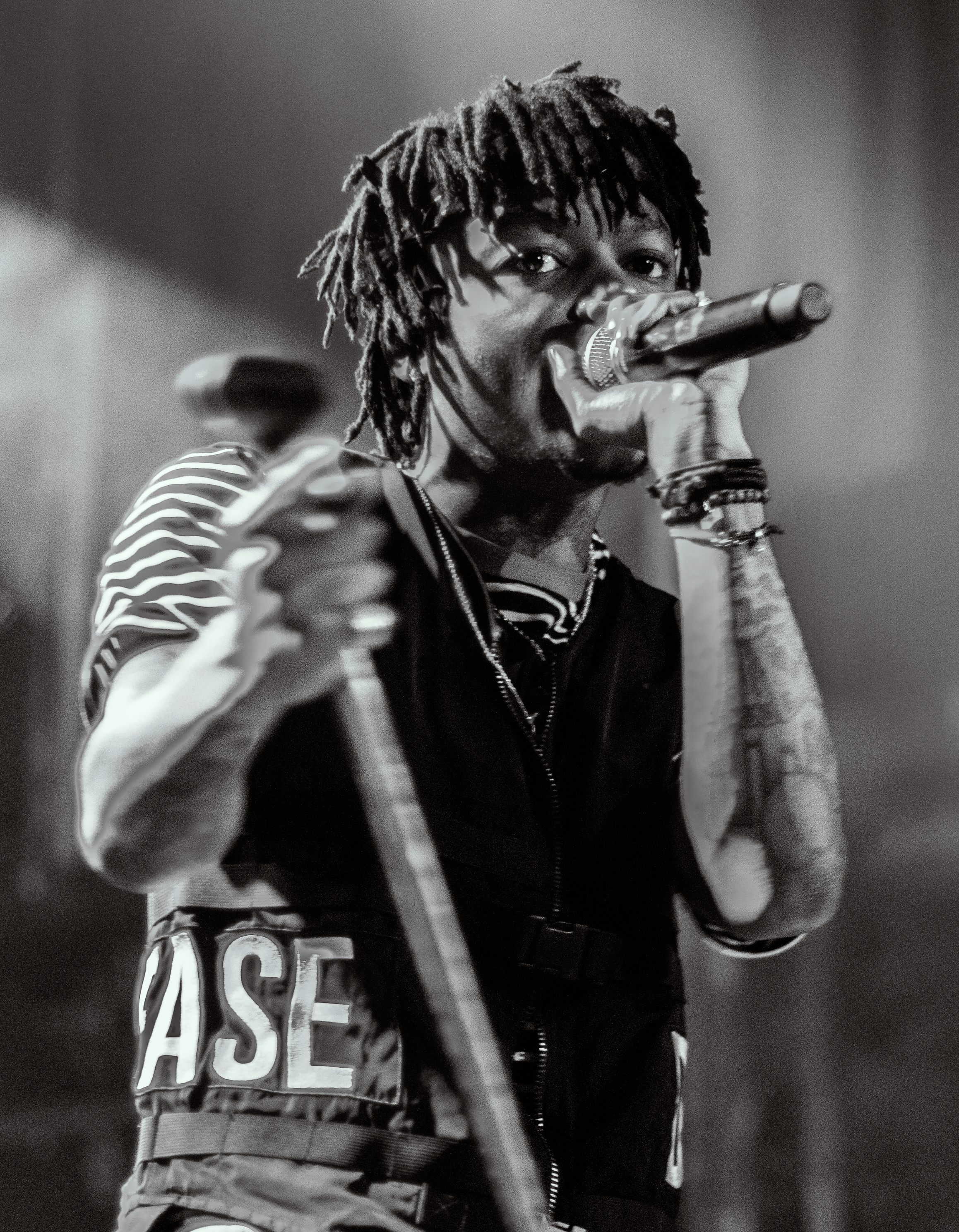
JID

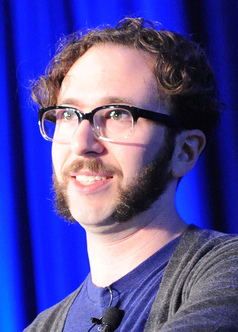
Darren Korb

The Game Awards 2021 featured performances from several artists, all of whom were backed by the Game Awards Orchestra. (Note: Conducted by Lorne Balfe and Jon Ong)

The following individuals or groups performed musical numbers. All performances were backed by the Game Awards Orchestra, primarily conducted by Lorne Balfe; Jon Ong, originally set to play flute in the orchestra, was tasked with conducting the Game of the Year medley as the show was running behind schedule and Balfe had to leave.

| Name | Song | Game(s) / show(s) |
|---|---|---|
| Sting | "What Could Have Been" | Arcane |
| Julie Elven | "Promise of the West" | Horizon Forbidden West |
| Lia Booth | "The Delicious Last Course Overture" | Cuphead: The Delicious Last Course |
| Adryon de León | "The Delicious Last Course Overture" | Cuphead: The Delicious Last Course |
| Natalie Hanna Mendoza | "The Delicious Last Course Overture" | Cuphead: The Delicious Last Course |
| Luena (Note: Virtual performance with dance choreography by 1MILLION Dance Studio) | "ROCKSTAR" | DokeV |
| Ashley Barrett | "Build That Wall (Zia's Theme)" | Bastion |
| Darren Korb | "Build That Wall (Zia's Theme)" | Bastion |
| Imagine Dragons | "Enemy" | Arcane |
| JID | "Enemy" | Arcane |
| The Game Awards Orchestra (Note: Conducted by Jon Ong) | Game of the Year medley (Note: The Game of the Year medley's songs included: "Rift Apart" from Ratchet & Clank: Rift Apart; "It Takes Two Theme" from It Takes Two; "Psychonauts 2 Title and Prologue" from Psychonauts 2; "Yearning for Dark Shadows" from Resident Evil Village; "Theme of Samus Aran" from Metroid Dread; "Welcome to Blackreef" from Deathloop) | Deathloop |
| The Game Awards Orchestra | Game of the Year medley | It Takes Two |
| The Game Awards Orchestra | Game of the Year medley | Metroid Dread |
| The Game Awards Orchestra | Game of the Year medley | Psychonauts 2 |
| The Game Awards Orchestra | Game of the Year medley | Ratchet & Clank: Rift Apart |
| The Game Awards Orchestra | Game of the Year medley | Resident Evil Village |

== Ratings and reception ==
=== Nominees ===
Some journalists felt Forza Horizon 5 and Returnal were snubbed in the nominations for the show's Game of the Year category. Den of Geek's Matthew Byrd criticized the absence of nominations for The Forgotten City in Best Narrative, Hitman 3 in Best Action/Adventure Game, and Unpacking in Best Independent Game, and felt Cyberpunk 2077's Best Role-Playing Game and Far Cry 6's Best Action Game nominations were undeserved. Game Rant's John Higgs similarly considered Unpacking among the biggest snubs. TheGamer's Josh Coulson felt The Forgotten City, Lost Judgment, and MLB The Show 21 were unrecognized, and Keanu Reeves deserved a nomination for his role as Johnny Silverhand in Cyberpunk 2077. Rachel Kaser of VentureBeat praised the diversity of the Best Performance nominees.

=== Ceremony ===
The show received a mixed reception from media publications. Push Square's Liam Croft enjoyed the new announcements, noting they continued to improve each year. BBC's Steffan Powell considered the announcement of Wonder Woman the biggest surprise, and Kotaku's Ari Notis found Have a Nice Death to be among the best reveals. VentureBeat's Dean Takahashi praised the announcements, describing The Matrix Awakens as "one of the most inspiring demos of the show", and felt the winners were well-deserved and focused on "innovation and gameplay over brands"; he noted the show proved the mainstream success of the video game industry with presenters and performers like Reeves, Liu, Sting, and Imagine Dragons. Kellen Browning of The New York Times called the show "a victory lap of sorts for the video game community", identifying its crossover with other entertainment mediums.

Schreier of Bloomberg News described the show as "an exhausting experience" after 2020's virtual ceremony, and heard in-person audience members complaining about the "non-stop barrage of trailers" and the show's length. From The Washington Post, Nathan Grayson claimed the crowd stopped paying attention towards the end of the show, and Shannon Liao said some were leaving the venue at least ten minutes before the conclusion; Grayson described some of the presenters' speeches as "jokey, canned", and felt the show was missing "unexpected live moments that capture everybody's attention" like previous ceremonies. Eurogamer's Wesley Yin-Poole echoed the latter sentiment, and wrote "the awards part of The Game Awards felt rushed". Todd Marten of the Los Angeles Times similarly felt the ceremony spent more time on announcements than awards, and criticized the lack of activism compared to the backlash of other awards shows like the Academy Awards and Golden Globes; he enjoyed the Halo television series preview and the performances of Imagine Dragons and Sting, but lambasted Doug Bowser's Metroid Dread acceptance speech as "hit-the-snooze-button marketing talking points". PC Gamer's Stanton felt the show needed to halve its length and focus solely on announcements to become "the true digital E3". Gavin Lane of Nintendo Life disliked that, despite the show's length, several awards were presented during the preshow.

=== Viewership ===
Over 85 million livestreams were used to view the ceremony, the most in the show's history to date. On Twitch, the show received a total of 3.35 million viewers, including co-streams from participating channels, and performance on the show's official YouTube channel increased by 14 percent over the previous year, with more than 1.75 million hours watched. On Twitter, 1.6 million tweets were made about the event—the most in the show's history—and it topped the trends for the eighth year in a row, with a peak of 11 of the top 30 trends related to the show.
