= Evolve (video game) =

2015 video game

- Developer: Turtle Rock Studios
- Publisher: 2K
- Director: Phil Robb
- Producer: Denby Grace
- Designer: Chris Ashton
- Artist: Phil Robb
- Composers: Jason Graves; Lustmord; Charlie Clouser; Danny Cocke
- Engine: CryEngine
- Platforms: Microsoft Windows; PlayStation 4; Xbox One
- Release: WW: February 10, 2015
- Genre: First-person shooter
- Modes: Single-player, multiplayer

Evolve is a defunct 2015 first-person shooter video game developed by Turtle Rock Studios and published by 2K. Announced in January 2014, the game was released worldwide for Microsoft Windows, PlayStation 4 and Xbox One in February 2015. Evolve uses an asymmetrical multiplayer structure, where five players—four playing as hunters and one as the monster—battle against each other on an industrialized alien planet called Shear. The hunters' gameplay is based on the first-person shooter design, while the monsters are controlled from a third-person perspective. The hunters' goal is to eliminate the monster, while the monster's goal is to consume wildlife and evolve to make themselves stronger before either eliminating the hunters, or successfully destroying the objective.

Evolve was Turtle Rock Studios' first major project after the company split from Valve in 2010. The concept for Evolve existed prior to the development of their previous game, Left 4 Dead. Inspired by hunting games such as Cabela's Big Game Hunter and Deer Hunter, the idea is to have prey that can strike back at the hunters. The monster design was originally intended to be esoteric but was later toned down. Turtle Rock found difficulty when seeking publishers that could provide funding and marketing for the game. THQ was originally set to serve as the game's publisher, but the rights to the franchise and publishing duties were transferred to 2K's parent company Take-Two Interactive after THQ filed for bankruptcy in late 2012.

Prior to release, Evolve received a largely positive reception and won the Best of Show Awards at Electronic Entertainment Expo 2014 and Gamescom 2014. Upon release, the game received positive reviews from critics, with praise mostly directed to the game's asymmetrical structure, controls, and designs. However, it received criticism for its progression system and light narrative, gameplay, as well as a large amount of downloadable content prepared. Evolve was a commercial success, although the player base significantly dwindled shortly after release. The game had briefly transitioned to become a free-to-play title known as Evolve Stage 2 before 2K Games shut down the game's dedicated servers in September 2018.

== Plot ==
The game is set in a fictional future where humans have successfully discovered ways to survive outside Earth and have begun colonizing other planets. Humans arrived at Shear, a distant planet located in the "Far Arm" of space, and began creating colonies and industrial factories.

As the colonisation progressed, humans began to meet resistance from alien life-forms, known as Monsters, that had the ability to evolve by consuming local wildlife. As the Monsters destroyed the colonies on Shear, a former "planet tamer" named William Cabot was brought out of retirement to deal with the threat and to evacuate the remaining colonists from Shear. Cabot assembled a team of Hunters to eliminate the Monsters and protect their communities.

== Gameplay ==
The hunters (top) are played from a first-person perspective, while the monster is played from a third-person perspective.

Evolve is an action video game with a focus on both co-operative, and competitive, multiplayer gameplay. The game adapts a '4v1' asymmetrical structure where four players take control of the Hunters, while the fifth player controls the Monster. The Hunters' main objective is to track and hunt the Monster in a limited amount of time, while the Monster's goal is to evolve and make themselves more powerful.

In the beginning of a match, a 30-second headstart is given to the Monster so that they can have enough time to escape before the Hunters parachute from a plane to where the Monster started. Each map features an open world environment for players to explore and play within. To help the Hunters navigate the environments quickly, they are equipped with jetpacks, allowing them to jump over obstacles and cliffs. The jetpack can also be used to dodge attacks performed by the monster, though it consumes a Hunter's energy. The team can track the monster, as well as place waypoints on an interactive map. The color of these waypoints are different based on what players have marked. The waypoint mark turns yellow for environment, orange for wildlife or red for the Monster.

The Monster needs to grow stronger in order to fight the Hunters by hunting and killing other local wildlife in order to gain experience points. When it gains enough experience, the Monster can evolve. Through evolution, the Monster's health bar is extended and refilled, and more abilities are available to the Monster, which makes it easier to kill the Hunters. However, the Monster is vulnerable during its evolution, and if caught by the hunters, the process is disrupted. The Monster can also enter a "stealth mode", allowing it to avoid detection by wildlife and Hunters.

Evolve features five different modes: Hunt, Nest, Rescue, Defend and Arena, which have different objectives for both the Hunters and the Monster. Evolve provides two different structures to these game modes: Quick Play, which starts a single playthrough match; and Evacuation, which serves as a five-match, multiplayer story mode. In Evacuation, each match gives the winning side an advantage in the next map, such as having a toxic gas the Monster is immune to, or autonomous gun turrets to assist the Hunters. The Evacuation mode ends with a 'Defend' match. Evolve also features an Observer Mode, allowing players to watch a match without playing in the match. The spectator can jump between cameras and view the match from both the Hunters' and the Monster's perspectives.

Normally, five players play in a standard round of Evolve, with four Hunters fighting one Monster. Playing with fewer than five players, including single player, is possible in all modes due to computer-controlled bots. These bots can control up to four of the characters, allowing between one and four human players in any game mode. Players can also switch to play as another class instantly in a single-player match.

=== Hunters ===
Evolve features a total of 20 different human characters split into four classes, each class containing 5 characters. Each class has different skills and abilities, and players are required to cooperate with each other in a match. Players unlock new characters as they progress through the game, e.g. the fourth Assault character will be unlocked if the player has upgraded the previous three Assault characters. The Hunters class features first-person gameplay. The ammunition of their weapons is automatically refilled when not in use, and iron sights are used in-game. Evolve does not allow multiple players to play as the same class in a match. Gameplay variations are also present within the characters in the same class.

- Assault: The Assault-class characters serve as the main "damage dealers" to the Monster. They are equipped with heavy weapons such as shotguns, rocket launchers, flame throwers, and mini-guns. Assault-class characters also have shields for their own protection and land mines. The shield provides temporary invulnerability to damage. Starting from stage 2, the invulnerability ability was changed to Defense Matrix, a new ability that reduces damages when being attacked by enemies.
- Trapper: The Trapper-class characters can use their gear to track the Monster's movements. As the Monster occasionally scatters local wildlife, such as birds, the trapper can use these 'signs' to find the location of the monster. Trappers also have other abilities and tools that can slow the movements of the Monster. Following the release of the Stage 2 alpha, all hunters gained the ability to use the mobile arena and the trappers gained the planet scanner ability, similar to the monster's smell.
- Support: The Support-class characters provide backup to the other characters. They are equipped with a damage dealing weapon, such as a laser cutter, or a shield that can be used to protect other Hunters. They also have the ability to provide temporary shields for nearby allies. In Stage 2, they gain the ability to charge the shields of their companions hunters.
- Medic: The Medic-class characters' main technique is replenishing the health of team members. Medics are also equipped with a damage dealing weapon. Some Medics also have the abilities to revive teammates that are incapacitated or killed by the Monster. According to Evolve's concept artist, those playing as Medics should stay back and avoid direct combat with the Monster, and only use their abilities when necessary.

Starting from the release of Stage 2, changes were made to the hunter classes. Every class now possesses the ability to deploy a force field, an ability once exclusive to the Trapper class. It can be used to limit the Monster's movement to a small area. The ability's cooldown time decreases when the hunters deal enough damage to the monster. Starting from Stage 2, the health of all hunters regenerate if they manage to avoid damage, and they no longer have to rely on the Medic class.

=== Monsters ===
There are a total of five Monsters featured in Evolve. Similar to the Hunters, players need to inflict a certain amount of damage before unlocking a new Monster. The five different Monster-types also have different abilities, both offensive and defensive. Players control the Monster from a third-person perspective, and it features gameplay similar to an action game, unlike the Hunters. More abilities are given to a Monster after its evolution. Gameplay mechanics were not changed much after the release of Stage 2, but monsters are made more powerful. They are given more health, stamina, armor, and skill points to unlock all abilities. Cooldown time abilities also shortened and recharge rate becomes significantly faster.

- Goliath: The Goliath is the starter Monster, available to all players. He has the strongest armor and health among the monsters. Goliath can charge and throw large rocks at Hunters, which can temporarily stun them, as well as perform attacks, such as breathing fire and "Leap Smash". Every monster has the ability to traverse the environment, Goliath's movement ability is to jump in the direction he is facing.
- Kraken: The Kraken is the second monster players unlock. Kraken is electricity-based, and can unleash attacks such as "Lightning Strike", "Vortex" and "Aftershock". He can also set up traps such as "Banshee Mines" around the map to slow the Hunters down. The Kraken's movement ability allows him to hover around in the sky and is the only monster that can fly.
- Wraith: The Wraith is the third unlockable monster. The Wraith can warp towards a Hunter and unleash a blast, dealing damage to the Hunters. She can also launch a supernova within a confined space which grants her accelerated attack speed. The Wraith also has the ability to teleport between places and abduct a Hunter whilst in a group. Her signature ability is a decoy that lets her create a copy of herself and turn invisible while the clone fights to confuse the Hunters, it is also useful when her armor pool is low. The Wraith's movement ability allows her to warp depending on the direction she goes.
- Behemoth: The Behemoth is a DLC character. Behemoth can unleash abilities such as "Lava Bomb" and "Fissure", which can stun Hunters. He can also create a "Rock Wall", which can isolate a Hunter from their companions. The Behemoth's movement ability is to turn into a ball and roll, he can run Hunters and other wildlife over to damage them a little bit.
- Gorgon: The Gorgon is also a DLC monster, The Gorgon has abilities such as "Acid Spit", and "Web Snare" which can slow down Hunters. The Gorgon also has two abilities that use a 'second Monster' called "Mimic", which allows herself to control a clone-version of Gorgon that explodes to deal damage to Hunters; and "Spider Trap", which sends a small spider to trap Hunters and slowly digests them. Gorgon's movement ability is similar to how Spiderman moves around. She shoots webs that allow her to traverse around the map, she can also cling on to walls and launch surprise attacks.

== Development ==
=== Origin ===
Evolve was developed by Turtle Rock Studios. Evolve's creative director, Phil Robb, and lead designer, Chris Ashton, are the co-founders of Turtle Rock Studios alongside Mike Booth. The team had a heritage of developing competitive multiplayer games, such as Valve's Counter-Strike series and the Left 4 Dead series. According to Robb, the team wanted to build a co-operative, multiplayer game because it gave the team a chance to play with their family and friends together, instead of against each other, and found it offered a more enjoyable experience than competitive multiplayer games. The concept for Evolve was completed in 2005, before the development of the first Left 4 Dead game. However, the Evolve project was put on hold, as Turtle Rock thought that the technology at that time was not advanced enough to handle the game's design.

Turtle Rock Studios merged into Valve in early 2008 but split away later the same year. When the company reestablished, it had only 13 staff members. As a new company, Turtle Rock Studios hoped to make use of the popularity of the Left 4 Dead franchise to create something ambitious and massive before people forgot about the company. When eighth generation video game consoles were released, the team realized they could create almost anything they wanted. They reviewed some of their previous projects and eventually chose Evolve, which seemed to be the most "straightforward" concept. The team also considered the new project as their "proving ground", a project that could show their ability to build a large-scale game beyond providing assistance to Valve. The development of Evolve officially began in early 2011.

=== Design ===
Evolve was inspired by hunting games Cabela's Big Game Hunter and Deer Hunter. Members of Turtle Rock Studios, including Robb and Ashton, thought that the gameplay of these hunting games, such as animal-tracking, was seldom incorporated in an action game. As a result, they came up with the original concept of Evolve in which, if players failed at hunting the animals, they could be attacked by their targets. Instead of typical big game animals such as elephants and lions, the team imagined it to be a "King Kong", which changed to an alien monster. The team picked a sci-fi setting, allowing them to add creative and unrealistic things into the game. The team also took the concept of boss battles, and expanded upon it by using the concept as a key idea when developing Evolve. The team envisioned Evolve as a video game version of Predator. The goal of Evolve was to create an experience that was new to video game players.

While Evolve carried some game mechanics from Left 4 Dead, others were discarded. The team originally thought that it could be added to the artificial intelligence system of Evolve's wildlife, but was later scrapped. They thought that the core experience offered by Evolve should be tracking and hunting the monster, instead of getting attacked by wildlife constantly. The team also thought that it would become an irritation if they added too many complex mechanics for the wildlife. The developer also intentionally chose not to make Evolve action-packed all the time, and introduced segments that would require players to slow down and track the Monster. Robb explained that the design team wanted to create a contrast, so that players could appreciate the action and chaotic moments after experiencing the less exciting segments.

When the design team was deciding on the number of Hunters in a match, they chose four as they believed it was the optimal number in a team, as players would not lose track of the stats and health of other players. It also allowed the players to work collaboratively with each other, so that no character would get left behind, or neglected, by the team. From the Monster's perspective, the design team thought that having four Hunters engaging in combat with the Monster would provide a challenge for the Monster, as they could find difficulties in keeping track of the Hunters, and this would make a match feel more balanced. The Hunter team was divided into several different classes because it "makes senses" according to Turtle Rock. In order to showcase the features and abilities of different classes, each class has different variations, in both appearances and costume colors. It was designed to make characters more recognizable and memorable. Another reason was that the design team wanted the Monster to adapt and use different strategies when dealing with different Hunters. Turtle Rock considered this a way to effectively extend Evolve's replayability and would add more variety to the gameplay. There were originally four Hunter characters in Evolve, but after the design team experimented with the free-to-play model, the list of characters was expanded to 16.

The titular "Evolve" game mechanic was inspired by the "bomb planting" mode from the Counter-Strike series. The Monsters started out as a relatively weak creature that could be defeated easily, but becomes stronger and gains more skills as it evolves. Early playtesters complained about the game mechanic, as they thought that this would bring an unfair disadvantage to the Hunters, since they do not "evolve" like the Monster. However, the design team still chose to maintain the game mechanic, as they thought that it would create an engaging experience. Ashton added that such game mechanics can create a "turning the tables" feeling for the Hunters, and that he thought that the sudden change in strategy – from offensive to defensive – could help deliver a dynamic experience to the players. The Monster was originally intended to play from a first-person perspective but was later shifted to a third-person perspective during development because the first-person control system was considered to be clumsy and confusing, and that the first person perspective took control away from players. The design team considered designing third-person gameplay a challenge, as they had no prior experience in creating such games. On the other hand, the design team implemented the first-person gameplay for the Hunters when Evolve's development started. The design team thought that the first-person perspective would provide a sense of tension as players would not be able to see what was behind them.

Evolve's environments are based on Earth's as the design team wanted to create a world that felt believable for players and had regions that made geological sense after an early concept design was found to be too extreme. As a result, the design team drew inspiration from real-world landscapes. The design team wanted Evolve to be set in lush forests so that Hunters and Monsters could hide from each other. The design team tried using the Source game engine to create a forest landscape but they ultimately failed. The design team then researched Crytek's CryEngine, which powers games like Far Cry and Crysis. As the design team felt that Far Cry and Crysis set new standards for in-game environments, they decided to utilize CryEngine for Evolve. Evolve's maps were designed to be dark and mysterious, so that the various characters can hide from each other, as well as presenting a sense of surprise when players are ambushed.

As Evolve is multiplayer-focused, the design team put less time and focus into developing Evolve's narrative and campaign. Conversations between characters were reduced during the multiplayer mode as the design team thought that it would negatively impact on the conversations between players. However, the story and narrative became more significant in the single-player mode. Evolve does not adapt traditional storytelling methods, nor use a campaign mode, instead, players learn about the Hunters' backstory and the fictional world of Shear by slowly progressing through Evolve. Playing as different characters would also lead to different conversations and dialogues between characters.

Concept art of Evolve's "Goliath" Monster

Evolve features a Cthulhu-inspired artstyle. As a result, much of the wildlife were intentionally designed to feature tentacles. Robb had previously drawn a lot of esoteric monster designs but the publisher, THQ at the time, thought that while the designs looked unique, they would not benefit the game. The team then began developing "marketing monsters" with a more stereotypical design. The original Goliath was based on a lobster, but changed to "a hybrid between King Kong and Godzilla", according to Evolve's producer, Robb. Anthropological design features were later added to Goliath's design to make the players feel more connected to the Monsters, especially when they are killed in the game. For the second monster, Kraken, the team wanted to create an electricity-based creature and looked at marine creatures, such as eels, for inspiration. The third monster, Wraith, was inspired by sirens. The team noted that the key feature of this monster was its abduction ability, which the design team felt would capture the tense and exciting moments of classic monster movies. The team had designed more than three monsters, but many of them were dropped due to technical issues with Evolve's artificial intelligence system, abilities that were deemed to be too powerful, and animation problems.

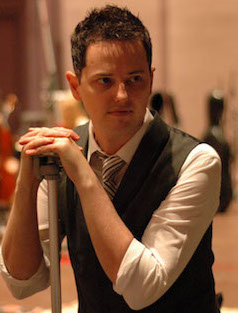
Jason Graves is a co-composer for the game.

Evolve's soundtrack was composed by Jason Graves and Lustmord. Graves composed the Monsters' soundtracks, while Lustmord composed the Hunters' soundtracks. According to Graves, much of the music was inspired by the Aliens vs. Predator series. Graves stated that he intentionally chose not to use an orchestra-based style for the music, instead, Graves used synthesizers to create sounds that he described as "odd". According to Graves, Evolve's soundtrack has "evolved" as the game development progressed, and that it had shifted to become more electronic and synth-based. The Hunters' soundtracks are more futuristic and synth-sounding, while the Monsters' soundtracks are more drum-intense and distorting.

=== Publishing ===
Evolve adapts an asymmetrical multiplayer structure, a new concept in the video game industry during its development. It was so new that the developer itself worried and wondered why no one else was working on such project. The design team was also uncertain about whether the 4v1 structure would work or not. According to Turtle Rock, when the publishers heard that the original creators of Left 4 Dead were making a new game, they were interested. However, the design team encountered difficulties when they were pitching the game, and used two months to prepare for the pitching process. According to Robb, publishers were conservative and unsupportive about the idea and "[attempted] to poke holes" in their pitch. Even though the representatives from these publishers were excited about their pitch after they knew that it would be an extension to the Tank mode in Left 4 Dead, they questioned the ability of Turtle Rock making a triple-A video game, and were uncertain whether it was a project they should invest in.

After multiple failures, the Turtle Rock team looked for a business partner, a company that supported the idea and was in need of a co-operative shooter to fit into their game's lineup. They eventually partnered with THQ for Evolve, which would serve as the game's publisher and help with funding. According to Robb, they had to show the game on their iPad, as they forgot to bring the battery for their laptop. THQ's then president, Danny Bilson and later, Jason Rubin were also excited about the idea. However, at that time, THQ had already entered financial difficulties, suffering from a severe decline in profits. Turtle Rock also knew that THQ had internal problems, but Turtle Rock decided not to part with THQ.

THQ's financial situation continued to worsen and they declared bankruptcy on December 19, 2012. Evolve was listed alongside other unannounced titles from Relic Entertainment, Vigil Games, and THQ Studios Montreal in court documents filed by THQ. With THQ unable to continue its publishing and funding roles, an auction was held for other publishers to acquire these titles. Publishers interested in the game visited Turtle Rock Studio to see their "secret project". The team was frustrated, as they felt that the situation was "out of their control". Rubin later contacted Ashton and Robb, and suggested that they should bid the game themselves. They bid $250,000 for their own project, which Ashton described as "what [they] had in the bank". However, they were outbid by Take-Two Interactive, which paid $11 million to acquire the game and to secure the rights to the entire franchise, and its publishing label. 2K Games then served as the game's publisher. Despite being outbid, the Turtle Rock team was still "super excited" to collaborate with 2K. On January 8, 2015, Turtle Rock and 2K announced that Evolve had been declared gold, indicating it was being prepared for duplication and release.

== Release ==
When Evolve was leaked in THQ's court document, it was expected that the game would be released on their 2015 fiscal year. The partnership between the two companies was revealed on May 26, 2011, and the game was re-revealed by gaming magazine Game Informer on January 7, 2014. It was announced that the game would be released for PlayStation 4, Windows, and Xbox One globally on October 21, 2014. However, 2K later decided to extend Evolve's development time frame, so as to allow Turtle Rock to further polish the game, as well as to "fully realize the vision for Evolve". As a result, Evolve was delayed to February 10, 2015.

Prior to release, the game had been playtested multiple times by the general public. An alpha version of Evolve, called the 'Big Alpha' was released for Xbox One on October 31, 2014, The alpha version of Evolve was originally set to be released for the PlayStation 4 a day later on October 31, 2014, but was delayed to November 3, 2014 due to technical issues related to PS4's firmware update. As compensation, the duration of the demo was extended by a day, and ended on November 4, 2014 for all platforms. Players can play as the four classes of Hunters as well as the Goliath and Kraken in the alpha version. Turtle Rock expected 100,000 people to participate in the alpha. The team hoped that through the alpha testing, they could test the functionality of the game's servers, and make adjustments to the game's balance. Open beta trials of Evolve on Xbox One were held January 14–19, 2015. A limited test for the PlayStation 4 and PC was held January 16–19, 2015. Players could play as the first eight Hunters as well as the Goliath and Kraken in the beta. The Evacuation mode was also added to the beta on January 17, 2015.

In addition to the game's standard edition, players can purchase the game's Season Pass, Deluxe Edition and PC Monster Race Edition. The Season Pass features four additional Hunters and a set of "magma" Monster skins. The Deluxe Edition features all the content of the Season Pass, as well as a new Monster called Behemoth. The PC Monster Race Edition, which is an exclusive for PC players, features the content of the Deluxe Edition, as well as the fifth Monster and two additional Hunters. After Evolve's release, a new season pass, called Evolve Hunting Pass 2 was released on June 23, 2015. It features new skins, Hunters and a new Monster.

=== Other media ===
On January 21, 2015, a mobile game titled Evolve: Hunter's Quest appeared briefly on the iOS App Store and was later removed. The game was released by 2K on January 29, 2015 for iOS, Android, Windows Phone and Fire OS devices. The game is a free-to-play tile-matching video game, as well as a companion app to Evolve. In Evolve: Hunter's Quest, players match three tokens of the same colour in order to unleash attacks on enemies, fill up energy bars to activate special Hunter abilities and earn mastery points to level up. Mastery points earned in-app can then be applied to characters in the main Evolve game on any platform. Players who download the app can also unlock unique game art and watch replays of online matches from a top-down view.

Evolve was launched with several merchandise items. Handled by Merchandise Monkey, the Evolve's merchandise collection includes T-shirts and different figurines. Funko also made several toys for Evolve, including 6 inches (15 cm) tall figurines of Markov, Val, Hank, Maggie and Goliath, each part of the first characters available to a player. A Goliath statue, standing at 29 inches (74 cm) tall, was also available for purchase.

=== Post-release ===
In an interview with Official Xbox Magazine, Ashton claimed that Evolve would have the "best support for downloadable content ever". However, many of the downloadable content packages are not covered by Evolve's Season Pass. In November 2014, Robb confirmed with IGN that all DLC maps will be free of charge. Robb stated the reason for this is "to allow people who don't have the DLC, to still play against those who do, the only difference is that they can't play as those hunters or monsters". Despite Turtle Rock claiming that all DLC maps would be free to all players, the high number of paid DLCs has attracted criticism from fans who feel that it constitutes a large amount of content being deliberately withheld to be sold. A large number of players who purchased the game wrote negative reviews for the game on Steam, complaining about the excessive amount of DLC planned as well as the general direction of the game, leading to an overall userscore of "Overwhelmingly Negative" on the platform. Turtle Rock Studios countered this by claiming that as much content as possible was packaged with the main game, with DLC only including content created after the completion of Evolve's development. At release, Evolve launched with 44 different paid-DLC skin packs.

Free updates were added to the game. The Observer mode was added on March 31, 2015, and a less strategic mode, the Arena mode, was introduced on May 26, 2015. Robb thought that the game's format has the potential to become an eSports game. 2K expressed similar enthusiasm, and added that they would allocate resources into developing eSports-centric features to Evolve if fans of the game expressed demands for it. Turtle Rock and 2K collaborated with Electronic Sports League and Sony Pictures Entertainment to host a special tournament, in which players have to battle Chappie, the titular robot from the film Chappie, in February 2015. A Pro-Am Tournament of Evolve took place on March 6, 2015 during PAX East. During the tournament, they revealed that the eSport future of Evolve is determined. On June 15, 2015, another tournament was hosted by the Electronic Sports League and 2K.

On July 6, 2016, Turtle Rock announced that the game was transitioning to become a free-to-play game under the title Evolve: Stage 2 due to the game downloadable content controversy and mixed critical reception. The new version introduces new changes, including longer respawn time, non-ranked queue for casual players, and changes to hunters' abilities. Turtle Rock also promised that patches would be released more frequently and that most items featured in the game would be unlocked through simply playing the game. The alpha version of Stage 2 began on July 7, 2016, for PC, and was followed by a beta in August of the same year. Players who purchased the game were given the Founders status, which gave them exclusive cosmetic items. In October 2016, Turtle Rock announced that they would end support for Evolve, and that Evolve: Stage 2 would not be released for consoles, but servers for the game will remain online for 'foreseeable future'. Turtle Rock also revealed that it was 2K's decision to end the game's support. On September 3, 2018, the game's dedicated servers were shut down, though the game remains playable with peer-to-peer connection using Legacy Evolve. In late July 2022, the multiplayer servers for Evolve: Stage 2 became reenabled, and later in October 2022 2K Games acknowledged the game's revival by reenabling the daily log-in bonus, and distributing free Steam Keys to members of the Evolve: Reunited Discord server. The game server's were again taken down "for the final time" in July 2023, rendering the game entirely unplayable.

== Reception ==
=== Pre-release ===
Evolve received a largely positive reception from critics upon its initial announcement. It was nominated for six different awards in the Game Critics Awards, namely Best of Show, Best Original Game, Best Console Game, Best PC Game, Best Action Game and Best Online Multiplayer. It won four of them, and lost the Best Original Game Awards to No Man's Sky and Best PC Game to Tom Clancy's Rainbow Six: Siege. Evolve was also named the Best Game, Best Console Game Microsoft Xbox, Best PC Game and Best Online Multiplayer Game at Gamescom 2014. Publisher 2K Games stated that these awards indicated that Evolve could become a defining title for both the PlayStation 4 and Xbox One. However, the DLC controversy caused backlash from customers, and the game was criticized for serving as a framework for the release of DLC.

=== Post-release ===
Reception

Aggregate score
Aggregator	Score
Metacritic	(PC) 77/100 (PS4) 76/100 (XONE) 74/100

Review scores
Publication	Score
Destructoid	6/10
Game Informer	8.5/10
GameRevolution	4/5
GameSpot	8/10
GamesRadar+	3.5/5
IGN	9/10
PC Gamer (UK)	83/100

Evolve received mostly positive reviews. Aggregating review website Metacritic gave the PlayStation 4 version 76/100 based on 46 reviews, the Windows version 77/100 based on 38 reviews, and the Xbox One version 74/100 based on 31 reviews. The game received backlash from users on Steam, due to the excessive amount of DLC sold on day one and the game for being overpriced.

The asymmetrical structure of the game mostly received praise from critics. Vince Ingenito, from IGN, thought that the system was smart and has successfully delivered a unique multiplayer experience for players. He added that the system is tactically deep, and that the "evolution" mechanic saved it from being gimmicky. This was contradicted by Steven Strom of Ars Technica, who stated that the game overall was just a "great gimmick and little else: something we'll play for a month or two, and not much longer." Evan Lahti, from PC Gamer, commended the structure and considered it the most compressed multiplayer experience since 2014's Titanfall. He added that such structure is something that the genre needs. GameSpot's Kevin VanOrd also appreciated the structure, which he thought made every battle feel "vicious and intense". Anthony LaBella of Game Revolution praised the asymmetrical idea and felt that the distinct gameplay elements between monsters and hunters successfully introduce Evolve to a broad audience. However, he noted that such a structure may become repetitive and boring for players after months of playthrough. Jeff Marchiafava, from Game Informer, also felt the structure to be limited, and that Evolve, even with all the modes, had failed to offer enough variety and challenges to players. Nic Rowan, from Destructoid, thought that Evolve had presented some of the best moments he had had in a multiplayer game, but he felt that these moments are too far between.

The Monster's gameplay was praised by Ingenito, as he thought it tasked players to use skills and patience while playing, and that Evolve has provided satisfying rewards for the player that successfully outsmarts the Hunters, a sentiment which was echoed by Strom. Lahti commended the Wraith, which he thought encouraged hit-and-run tactics. However, Rowan thought that the Monster gameplay can get old very fast. Furthermore, he noted that several Monsters felt overpowered, which made Evolve feel unbalanced. The controls of the game received praise. Marchiafava thought that it was smartly designed, and applauded it for its accessible nature. Lahti wrote a similar statement, but thought that the gameplay would be "difficult to master". David Meikleham from GamesRadar praised Evolve's shooting mechanic, but complained that the action presented on-screen can become too chaotic for players to handle. Strom felt that the game-modes were unbalanced in terms of fun, and that certain game-modes prioritized fun for one team at the penalty of the other, and criticized the fact that outside of private lobbies with friends, you cannot choose any game-mode other than Hunt.

The process of hunting the Monster was praised. Ingenito thought that the hunting process was as tense as the actual confrontation and combat between the Hunters and the Monster. The four classes was also applauded by him, as he considered that the distant class abilities have successfully made players co-operate with each other in order to achieve success, as well as making the decision of choosing the correct character important and tactical. This was also contradicted by Strom, who felt that the hunter gameplay up until finding the monster was "hollow", and generally just consisted of going around in circles. Marchiafava thought that Evolve had successfully delivered a compelling experience while playing with other players. He was also surprised by the game's balance between the Monster and the Hunters. Meikleham thought that playing the game with other players can be an exhilarating experience, but only when players communicate with each other using microphones. Rowan thought that Evolve could only deliver an enjoyable experience when all players play cooperatively, and the overall experience would crumble if one of these players failed to do so. Lahti liked Evolve's resources management, singling out the need for the Hunters to manage and conserve the energy for their jetpacks.

The Hunter characters featured in the game received praise. Ingenito thought that the Hunters in the game were memorable due to their pre-game dialog, and thought that the dialogue was well written. He called this the "true beauty" of Evolve. Rowan echoed a similar statement, calling the banter "charming". Marchiafava thought that the progression system has made the banter between characters repetitive because players need to play the game continuously to unlock characters. Marchiafava compared the narrative unfavorably to that of Left 4 Dead, and thought that it was not emergent enough.

Evolve's map-design received mixed reviews. Ingenito thought that Shear was a "beautifully realized" planet, while Marchiafava thought that all the maps were both detailed and varied. VanOrd thought that Turtle Rock had successfully captured an unsettling atmosphere, and applauded the verticality of the maps. Lahti agreed that the maps were well-designed. However, he criticized them for being "homogeneous", as all the maps felt too similar to each other, and none offered a particularly unique experience that required players to change their tactics. He added that the lack of variety had significantly lowered Evolve's replayability. Meikleham echoed a similar statement, adding that the maps are "bland", and that they did not look different from each other.

The progression system received criticism. Ingenito thought that it was an unnecessary addition to the game. He added that the upgrade system hides a lot of content from players unless they play the game frequently. Lahti, however, stated that after every character is unlocked, he felt less motivated to continue to play the game. LaBella thought that the system does not offer enough content and described it as "thin". This was echoed by Strom, who felt that unlocking the characters was a "grind".

=== Sales ===
Evolve debuted in No. 1 in the UK software-sales chart; the first title 2K Games had published to take the No. 1 spot since March 2013. Evolve was the second best selling game in the United States in February according to the NPD Group, only behind the handheld game The Legend of Zelda: Majora's Mask 3D. However, the average player count on Steam declined significantly since the game's launch. The game's player count increased 15,930% and was listed as one of Steam's most-played games after its transition to a free-to-play model. More than a million new players played the game after the transition.

Financial analyst Doug Creutz, of the Cowen Group, estimated only 300,000 physical copies were sold in Evolve's launch month, and by its current sales rate, a well-below average figure for the triple-A gaming industry. Creutz stated that Evolve may be "too niche to reach a wide audience", adding that the negative reception to its DLC plan has hindered its success considerably. Despite such estimations, Karl Slatoff, President of Take-Two Interactive, stated that Evolve has achieved an "incredibly successful" launch and that the company was very satisfied with the sales of the game. As of May 2015, 2.5 million copies of the game had been shipped. Take-Two CEO Strauss Zelnick considered the property one of their "permanent" franchises, joining Grand Theft Auto, BioShock and Red Dead.
