= Nox (video game) =

2000 video game

- Developer: Westwood Studios
- Publishers: NA: Westwood Studios; EU: Electronic Arts
- Producers: Ken Allen; Frank Hsu; Mark Skaggs
- Designers: John Hight; Mike Booth; Brett Sperry
- Programmer: Mike Booth
- Artist: Phil Robb
- Writer: Neal Halford
- Composer: Frank Klepacki
- Platform: Microsoft Windows
- Release: NA: February 16, 2000; EU: February 25, 2000
- Genre: Action role-playing
- Modes: Single-player, multiplayer

Nox is an action role-playing game developed and published by Westwood Studios and Electronic Arts in 2000 for Microsoft Windows. It details the story of Jack, a young man from Earth who is pulled into a high fantasy parallel universe and has to defeat the evil sorceress Hecubah and her army of necromancers to return home. Depending on the player's choice of character class at the beginning of the game (warrior, conjurer, or wizard), the game follows three largely different linear storylines, each leading to its unique ending.

In multiplayer, players can compete against each other in various game modes such as deathmatch and capture the flag, while the freely downloadable expansion pack NoxQuest added a cooperative multiplayer mode. The game was generally well received by critics and the media.

== Gameplay ==
The player controls Jack from oblique perspective with the mouse and a number of pre-defined hotkeys. The line of sight is limited by an innovative and well-received fog of war system named "TrueSight", which dynamically blacks out portions of the screen which Jack cannot see from his current position. The single-player campaign consists of multiple locations which Jack must explore, killing enemies and monsters and assisting his allies. In each campaign the player receives a piece of a powerful magical staff and must gain the other two pieces, which are guarded by factions representing the classes not chosen by the player, ultimately using the assembled weapon to defeat Hecubah. Most of the game time is spent in dungeons and wilderness where Jack gathers experience points and collects items such as weapons, armor and spells, which can be equipped, learned, or sold to traders found in several locations throughout the game. The story is told through dialogue with non-player characters, cut scenes using the game engine, and a few pre-rendered full motion videos.

Depending on the character class the player selects at the beginning of the game, the style of gameplay varies greatly. The warrior characters are able to equip nearly all armour and mêlée weapons available in the game but cannot use bows, magical staves, or magical spells. They do have five spell-like special abilities but instead of using up magic points like the other classes' spells, they recharge over time. The conjurer class specializes in conjuration of various monsters found throughout the game, healing himself and his allies, and the use of bows and crossbows. They have a smaller array of spells than wizards but can summon monsters they've learned about from items called "Beast Scrolls". Alternatively, they can tame wild animals and monsters into following and fighting for them. The wizard characters are very limited in equippable weapons and armor and have very few hit points but can learn the largest array of magical spells, which they can use not only to kill enemies, but also to teleport themselves, to become invisible, and to heal themselves and their allies. Owing to its origins as a multiplayer magical combat simulator, the magic system is complex and allows for spell combinations and traps, inspired by Magic: The Gathering.

Weapons in the game come in many varieties and largely restricted to certain classes: most melee weapons and a few ranged weapons can only be used by warriors; bows and crossbows, by conjurers; and many magical staves, by wizards. Some weapons have enchantments on them that add magical bonus to the physical damage they deal to enemies. Armor can also have enchantments on it, protecting the wearer from certain types of harm (fire, poison, etc.). With very few exceptions, both weapons and armor wear down when used, so the player must either have them repaired by NPC traders or replace them with new items. At several points of the single-player campaign, non-player characters temporarily follow Jack, either to assist him or to be led to safety by him. These NPCs can be neither controlled by the player nor equipped with better items.

The multiplayer game types are similar to those found in online first-person shooters: deathmatch (further subdivided into "free for all", team, and clan modes), capture the flag, "Flagball" (similar to the "Bombing Run" mode in Unreal Tournament), "King of the Realm", and "Elimination" (deathmatch with limited respawns). The expansion pack NoxQuest introduced an eponymous cooperative multiplayer mode, wherein a player team must navigate through various locations, killing monsters and looting items. Originally, Westwood ran an online ladder ranking system of Nox multiplayer matches and team-based "Clan Matches" but it has since been closed down. The online services of the game were officially replaced by redirecting to the server portal XWIS maintaining the game's online playability; a feature shared by other Westwood Studios Command & Conquer titles.

== Plot ==
=== Synopsis ===
The back-story of Nox is explained through location loading screens. Some decades before Jack's arrival to the Land of Nox (the eponymous fictional setting of the game), a group of Necromancers attempted to seize control over the world but was stopped by the legendary hero Jandor wielding an artifact weapon named "the Staff of Oblivion". Following the Necromancers' defeat, Jandor trapped their souls within the magical Orb, which the Arch-Wizard Horvath then transported to another dimension later revealed to be modern Earth. One of Jandor's last deeds of the war was saving a female infant he found in the Necromancers' lair: unsure what to do with a possible Necromancer offspring, he left the girl in the care of an Ogre village. He then disassembled the Staff and gave each piece to one of the three powerful factions in the game: the Fire Knights of the fortress Dün Mir (the Halberd of Horrendous), the wizards of Castle Galava (the Heart of Nox), and the conjurers' Temple of Ix (the Weirdling Beast). After this, he assumed the nickname "Airship Captain", under which he plays a mentor role to the player throughout the game.

The game opens with a pre-rendered video of a grown-up Hecubah, the Necromancer girl, who has rediscovered her roots and proclaimed herself the Queen of Necromancers, summoning the Orb back from Earth to greatly increase her power. However, her magic also transports the current owner of the artifact, Jack (who believes it to be a fireplace mantel decoration), to the Land of Nox. Jack lands on Jandor's airship and at this point, the storylines branch, depending on the player's selection of character class. The warriors start the game near the subterranean fortress of Dün Mir; conjurers, near the Village of Ix; and wizards, near Castle Galava. Upon completing any one of the storylines, the Airship Captain's voice during the rolling credits prompts the player to complete the game using another class.

- Upon reaching Dün Mir, the warrior characters must go through the Gauntlet, a labyrinth full of monsters, to prove their skills to the Warlord Horrendous and to gain the rank of a "Fire Knight". Horrendous then sends the player to the Village of Ix to help the conjurers get rid of hedgehog-like monsters harassing the settlement. On the way back, Jack runs into some undead and to investigate them, the Airship Captain transports him to the Field of Valor, the battlefield-turned-graveyard of the Necromancer war. In the crypts beneath the Field, the player first encounters Hecubah and has to fight one of her Necromancer henchmen and many undead. Jack exits the crypts to find the nearby city of Brin devastated by an Ogre invasion and is entrusted with rescuing a group of women taken to the Ogre village of Grok Torr. Afterwards, Jandor arrives and tells Jack to reassemble the Staff of Oblivion and to defeat Hecubah with it. The first part to retrieve is the Halberd of Horrendous so Jack returns to Dün Mir, now besieged by undead, and witnesses Hecubah killing the Warlord. He is able to retrieve the Halberd and travels to Castle Galava to collect the second part of the Staff, the Heart of Nox, guarded by hostile wizards. The third part is the Weirdling, a living creature kept in the Temple of Ix and guarded by powerful monsters. The final part is the Orb itself, so Jack has to find his way to the Necromancers' Land of the Dead through the Dismal Swamp. Upon reassembling the Staff, he follows Hecubah to the Underworld and defeats her in the climactic final battle. After her death, Jack is immediately transferred back to Earth through a magical portal.
- The conjurers start the game in the vicinity of the Village of Ix. Jack's first tasks are to locate his future mentor Aldwyn and to clear out the same monster lair as in the warrior's storyline. The third task is to rescue the Mana Mine workers near Ix who were befallen by monsters and scattered. Suspecting Hecubah behind the Mana Mine incident, the Airship Captain sends Jack to the Field of Valor. This part of the game is identical to the warrior's route, except that the conjurer must retrieve the Arch-Wizard Horvath's Amulet of Teleportation from Grok Torr instead of rescuing Brin women. Upon retrieving the Halberd of late Horrendous, Jack travels to Galava to find it overrun by the Ogres. Unlike the warrior, the conjurer is assisted by the wizards, and Horvath sacrifices himself to let Jack escape Hecubah. Retrieving the Weirdling and the rest of the game is identical to the warrior's storyline but the finale is different: using his abilities to possess Hecubah's Ogre bodyguards, Jack entraps her soul within the Orb, and the ending video sees Jandor pondering how to transport him back home.
- The wizards route begins near Castle Galava, where Jack is tutored by Arch-Wizard Horvath. The first task is to locate Horvath's missing apprentice whose death prompts the Arch-Wizard to replace him with Jack. Now a wizard apprentice, the protagonist performs multiple duties around Galava, one of which sees him fighting a Necromancer. Like in the other two storylines, the Airship Captain transports Jack to the Field of Valor after this, and the plot remains the same except that Horvath himself must be rescued from the Ogre village. Unlike the warrior and the conjurer, however, the wizard has to take the Halberd from Horrendous by killing him. Jack returns to Castle Galava where Horvath hands him the Heart of Nox before being killed by Hecubah, who also teleports Jack to the Underworld. After escaping it, Jack retrieves the Weirdling and travels to the Land of the Dead like in the other routes. However, the wizard characters receive a twist ending wherein upon being defeated, Hecubah turns into an apparently innocent and amnesiac version of herself. Jack's final words in the game suggest that he stays in the Land of Nox with the redeemed Hecubah.

=== Characters ===
- Jack Mower is the protagonist of the game. At the beginning of the story, he lives in a trailer with his girlfriend Tina on Earth and is the owner of the Orb. After Hecubah's magic transports him to the Land of Nox along with the Orb and his TV set, he is tutored by Jandor and either Horrendous, Aldwyn, or Horvath to become the new hero of Nox. In the warrior route, Jack returns to Earth; in the conjurer route, his return home is left uncertain; and in the wizard route, he stays in Nox. He is voiced by Seann William Scott.
- Hecubah is the self-proclaimed Queen of Necromancers and the chief antagonist of the game. Her origins are unknown, as Jandor found her in the Land of the Dead after the Necromancer war and left her in care of an Ogre village. Her magic summons both the Orb and Jack to the Land of Nox, eventually leading to her demise. Jack kills her in both the warrior and the conjurer routes but as a wizard, he is able to purify her soul, turning her into an innocent and amnesiac version of herself. She is voiced by Joanna Cassidy.
- Jandor, also known as the "Airship Captain", is the legendary hero of the Necromancer war who defeated the Necromancer army with the Staff of Oblivion. After that, he assumed the identity of an eccentric old airship captain, who plays mentor role to Jack throughout the game. His real identity is revealed half-way through the game, when he instructs Jack to reassemble the Staff. He is voiced by Alan Oppenheimer.
- Warlord Horrendous is the leader of the Fire Knights of the fortress Dün Mir and the guardian of the first piece of the Staff of Oblivion, the Halberd named after him. In the warrior route, he tutors Jack for a short time before sending him to the Village of Ix. In all storylines, Horrendous is killed before Jack acquires the Halberd, either by Hecubah or by Jack himself (as a wizard). He is voiced by Mark Rolston.
- Aldwyn the Conjurer is the most powerful conjurer in the Land of Nox, who briefly tutors Jack in the conjurer route. He is loosely affiliated with the Temple of Ix, where the Weirdling is kept, and lives far to the east of the Village of Ix. He is brother of Mordwyn the Druggist. Aldwyn is voiced by Warren Burton.
- Arch-Wizard Horvath is the head of the wizards of Castle Galava, where the Heart of Nox, the second part of the Staff of Oblivion, is kept. He doesn't appear in the warrior route but is a prominent figure in the wizard's one, wherein he first accepts Jack as his apprentice, is then saved by him from the Ogre village, and finally sacrifices himself to let Jack escape Hecubah. He is voiced by Ian Abercrombie.
- Morgan Lightfingers is a notorious thief and con artist whom all classes meet under different circumstances: the Wizard must capture him early in the game, while the Warrior must cooperate with him to escape from Castle Galava prison; to the Conjurer, Morgan simply sells a cheap bow. He is voiced by Warren Burton.
- Mordwyn the Druggist is Aldwyn's brother who lives in the Dismal Swamp and appears late in every game route to briefly assist Jack on his quest. He is voiced by Bill Woodsen, who also provides the narrator voice in the game.
- Gearhart is the chief engineer of Dün Mir whose commendation is necessary for Jack to apply for a Fire Knight rank. He is voiced by Mike Booth, who was also the author of the original concept of the game and its lead programmer.
- Mayor Theogrin is the cowardly chief of the Village of Ix. He plays a minor role in warrior and conjurer routes. He is voiced by Lee Perry.
- Tina is Jack's girlfriend on Earth who appears in the intro and the warrior ending video. She is voiced by Susan Chesler.

== Development ==
=== Production ===
The development of the game started in 1995 as a personal project of Mike Booth, the future technical director and lead gameplay designer of the game. An avid gamer, Booth began programming his own games on Apple II and VIC-20 computers while still at school, and started working on Nox "in a spare bedroom of [his] house" in college. To help produce the game, he co-founded Hyperion Technologies, a company that also worked on driving simulators. After Booth showed a demo of Nox to John Hight, an executive producer of Westwood Studios, at the 1997 Game Developers Conference, Westwood decided to acquire it and moved the development team to California.

Booth originally envisioned the game as an "updated version of Atari's Gauntlet", focusing on real-time magical combat in the vein of Magic: The Gathering and Mortal Kombat. Inspired by the "epic wizard battles" described in fantasy literature, Booth wanted to create a "multiplayer wizard battle game" and decided to set it in a medieval fantasy setting. It wasn't until Westwood started working on the game that it began to lean towards the RPG genre and two more classes (warrior and conjurer) and a single-player campaign were added.

The game was originally intended to be played with a gamepad, with spells cast by quickly pressing several buttons, inspired by Mortal Kombat's combos, but it was eventually deemed to be "a large barrier for new and less dexterous players" and replaced with numeric hotkeys and mouse-controlled movement. The leftovers of this system are, however, still seen in the released game in the form of syllables and hand gesture icons accompanying the casting of each spell. The "TrueSight" vision system has been programmed by Booth early in the development and served as one of the cornerstones of the gameplay.

The multiplayer modes were inspired by the online first-person shooters, such as Quake and Unreal, both of which the development team played extensively.

=== Marketing ===
The game was "one of the most-hyped games" at E3 1999 and well received by journalists. In particular, they praised the TrueSight vision system, the "elegant" interface, and the dynamic game world.

In October 1999, Westwood began "Meet Nox Tour" in San Francisco Bay Area as part of a marketing campaign to raise awareness of the game and receive beta-testing feedback. The event was a LAN party lasted about five hours and capped off with a series of multiplayer tournaments; with a final prize of US$200 CompUSA stored-value card. The entire tour ended shortly before the release of the game and was, according to the executive producer John Hight, "a tremendous success". To promote Nox in post-launch, another event was organized in June 2000 in Las Vegas by Westwood; the LAN party was a mass tournament, ended with a final head-to-head clash between two highest-score gamers to win a new computer system worth US$2,500.

Nox has been re-distributed via digital delivery on Origin, and CD Projekt's GOG.com.

== Reception ==
Reception

Aggregate score
Aggregator	Score
GameRankings	81%

Review scores
Publication	Score
AllGame	4/5
CNET Gamecenter	8/10
Computer Games Strategy Plus	4/5 (NQ) 3.5/5
Computer Gaming World	3.5/5
Game Informer	8.5/10
GameFan	84%
GamePro	4.5/5
GameRevolution	B+
GameSpot	8.1/10
GameSpy	88%
IGN	8.9/10
Next Generation	3/5
PC Accelerator	8/10
PC Gamer (US)	89%

The game received favorable reviews according to the review aggregation website GameRankings. It was often compared to Diablo II, which was released five months after it. Trent C. Ward of IGN praised the game as a successful clone of Diablo and highly recommended the former, citing its graphics and gameplay quality, but criticizing some of its sound effects. P. Stefan "Desslock" Janicki of GameSpot said that some of the gameplay elements are completely new, and appreciated both single-player and multiplayer component of the game, describing it as challenging and entertaining. On the contrary, Johnny B. of GameRevolution declared that the game has "nothing very original", although it has appreciable graphics, variety and gameplay. The game was reviewed in 2000 in Dragon #271 by Johnny L. Wilson in the "Silicon Sorcery" column. Wilson commented that "the game has beautiful art, impressive technology, near-limitless action, and a marvelous style in its use of traps". Michael Lafferty of GameZone gave it nine out of ten, saying, "With the great graphics, interactive game board and challenge, this is bound to be one of the most successful titles Westwood has ever produced." However, Eric Bratcher of NextGen said, "Nox will have a difficult time avoiding the dismissal, 'Diablo wannabe' (especially with Diablo II looming on the horizon), but those who try it will find a solid game that can stand on its own merits."

During the AIAS' 3rd Annual Interactive Achievement Awards, Nox was a finalist for the "Outstanding Achievement in Character or Story Development" and "Outstanding Achievement in Game Design" awards, both of which were ultimately given to Age of Empires II: The Age of Kings, Thief: The Dark Project (both of them in a tie), and The Sims, respectively.

== Cancelled sequel ==
Executive producer John Hight said that Westwood was considering an expansion pack and a sequel to Nox. The expansion, titled NoxQuest, was released as a free download on August 1, 2000, and focused on the multiplayer aspects of the game. It included the last patch, updating the game to version 1.2, and featured a number of new spells invented for but not implemented in the original game.

Shortly after the 1.2 patch release, Westwood Studios (which is a subset of Electronic Arts) lost full rights of Nox to EA. EA chose to no longer support Nox, and the official Westwood servers for Clan, Ladder and Standard multiplayer were closed, as well as the online ladder ranking system.
