= Turtle Rock Studios =

American video game developer

- Formerly: Valve South (2008–2010)
- Type: Subsidiary
- Industry: Video games
- Founded: March 2002; 24 years ago
- Founder: Mike Booth; Phil Robb; Chris Ashton
- Headquarters: Lake Forest, California, US
- Key people: Steve Goldstein (president and GM)
- Products: Counter-Strike series; Left 4 Dead; Evolve; Back 4 Blood
- Number of employees: ~125
- Parent: Valve (2008–2010); Tencent (2021–present)
- Subsidiaries: Turtle Rock Garage
- Website: www.turtlerockstudios.com

Turtle Rock Studios (known as Valve South between 2008 and 2010) is an American video game developer founded in March 2002 by Mike Booth. It was acquired by Valve in 2008, but was re-founded in 2010 as a subsidiary of Slamfire Inc. by Phil Robb and Chris Ashton. Turtle Rock Studios is involved in the creation of original titles as well as the provision of consulting services to the digital entertainment industry.

The company's most notable games are the first Left 4 Dead, which was published by Valve; Evolve, which was originally set to be published by THQ but was later published by 2K Games; and Back 4 Blood, which was published by Warner Bros. Games. The founder of the company had worked for Westwood Pacific, and assisted in the development of the Counter-Strike series. The company expanded from six employees to more than seventy staff members from 2011 to 2014 and opened a subsidiary company called Turtle Rock Garage in 2011, which specialized in developing casual and experimental games for platforms such as iPhone, Facebook, and Xbox Live. Tencent acquired the company in December 2021.

== History ==
=== Prior to founding ===
Turtle Rock Studios was founded by Michael Booth. Prior to the company's establishment, Booth, Phil Robb and Chris Ashton worked for Westwood Pacific and participated in the development of real-time strategy games like Command & Conquer: Red Alert 2. Ashton, who had also worked for Presto Studios, was impressed by Counter-Strike, which was a popular mod of Half-Life, and decided to join the mod team as a texture artist. Eventually, Seattle-based Valve, the developer of Half-Life, purchased the mod, and Ashton left Westwood to join Valve. Robb and Booth remained at Westwood Studios and worked on Command & Conquer: Yuri's Revenge and Command & Conquer: Generals, but left the company after it was acquired by Electronic Arts, as Robb considered EA's acquisition of Westwood had resulted in the studio losing all its personality.

=== Turtle Rock (2002–2007) ===
Turtle Rock Studios was founded in 2002. The team of about six people had limited resources, so the group set up work space in Booth's garage. The name "Turtle Rock" derived from the name of the neighbourhood where Booth lived. The team expanded the studio and rented an office, and continued the development of Condition Zero. The game was released in 2004. Satisfied with the work done by Turtle Rock, Valve continued to contract them to work on the Xbox version of Counter-Strike, as well as the next installment of the series, Counter-Strike: Source, and Half-Life 2: Deathmatch. Upon the release of Source, the company wanted to work on a new game, and gained support from Valve. The team later chose to design a first-person wizard combat game.

As the team had developed only competitive multiplayer games before, they wanted to design a game that encouraged and supported co-operative gameplay between players; a game that would allow family and friends to play together instead of against each other, citing Secret of Mana as an example. The team decided to use source code from Counter-Strike to develop a mod called Terror-Strike, which is a scenario where players fight against bots, which are equipped only with knives and act like zombies. They also changed the texture of the game to create a gritty, dark atmosphere. It was not conceived as a full-budget project at that time. Meanwhile, the wizard combat game was scrapped as the team considered the project over-complicated and "geeky"; they decided to use the cancelled project as a prototype to work on the zombie game. The idea of developing a zombie game grew after the team watched 28 Days Later, a critically acclaimed zombie film. The film helped the team brainstorm ideas for their zombie game. After that, the team decided to remove all the Counter-Strike content and started developing the zombie game, in which players have to plant zombie bait and kill all the zombies present in the level. The focus later shifted to evacuating and surviving in a zombie-infested area. The project was later presented to Valve, which helped the game's funding and publishing. The project's name was Left 4 Dead, and its development began in 2005. The title was announced on November 20, 2006, and was released in November 2008 for Microsoft Windows and the Xbox 360.

=== Valve South (2008–2010) ===
On January 10, 2008, before the release of Left 4 Dead, Valve announced that it had purchased Turtle Rock in an effort to expand the company's console market. Gabe Newell, founder and president of Valve, added that it was an easy decision for the company to make, as they had high expectations for Left 4 Dead and considered themselves having a long-term relationship with Turtle Rock. After being acquired by Valve, Turtle Rock served as Valve's in-house satellite development team, and was renamed Valve South.

With the establishment of Valve South, nine to eleven employees moved to work at Valve's headquarters in Seattle. After their departure, Valve felt that the size of the team at Valve South was too small to allow it to operate as a triple A studio, and that coordination between the two studios was difficult as they were physically far apart from each other. Meanwhile, Turtle Rock felt that the team's communication with Valve was lacking, and it was dissatisfied with Valve and the slow progression of projects. As a result, Newell proposed that Turtle Rock to be split from Valve, and that Valve South be shut down after the shipment of Left 4 Dead. Valve retained the rights to the Left 4 Dead franchise, while allowing the name "Turtle Rock" and its logo to be used again by the original team. This news was later confirmed by Doug Lombardi of Valve on June 3, 2009.

=== Turtle Rock (2010–2021) ===
After being formally closed, the remaining team members including Ashton and Robb decided to restart Turtle Rock as an independent company on March 17, 2010. On the same day, Turtle Rock Studios put up a new website announcing it had reformed and were once again working on video games. They released an iPhone automotive maintenance app named Garage Buddy and began hiring for a full-scale project. Upon the company's reestablishment, Booth left the company, and Robb and Ashton were requested to share the position of studio head. Ashton initially declined it, but eventually accepted and partnered with Robb to lead the studio. Both of them considered themselves developers not managers, and they found the task of running Turtle Rock a tough challenge. At that time, there were about 13 staff members in the studio. The team later rented a warehouse and re-designed it to accommodate them.

Despite being shut down by Valve, Turtle Rock still maintained a relatively close working relationship with it. The studio was contracted by Valve to work on the post-launch content for Left 4 Dead and its sequel Left 4 Dead 2, which was developed in-house by Valve, and worked on Counter-Strike: Global Offensive during its early phase of development. Eventually, the studio decided to split away from the two franchises to work on something new. On June 2, 2010, Turtle Rock Studios announced the formation of a new division within Turtle Rock called Turtle Rock Garage, a small division based solely on casual games. On September 22, 2010, Digital Development Management announced it was representing Turtle Rock Studios to find publishers for its games.

For us this is a big deal, this is our proving ground. We are not just Valve's bitch. I feel for the past 20 years we've been having to prove ourselves over and over. So here we are again, trying to prove ourselves.

— Phil Robb, co-founder of Turtle Rock on Evolve

The concept of its next project had begun prior to the development of Left 4 Dead. Inspired by the asymmetrical mode of Left 4 Dead, and hunting games like Cabela's Big Game Hunter, the team wanted to create a game where prey could strike back at hunters. The concept eventually became Evolve, and was the company's next full-scale project. Turtle Rock pitched the game to multiple publishers including Valve. Most of them were not supportive of the idea of an asymmetrical multiplayer video game; Valve was also not interested in the project. These companies thought that Turtle Rock was too small to handle a Triple-A project. Publisher THQ decided to accept the game and help with its funding. THQ's then president Danny Bilson and Jason Rubin were very enthusiastic about the idea of having an asymmetrical multiplayer game like Evolve. Rubin once hoped that Turtle Rock could develop a free-to-play business model for the game. This idea was later scrapped, and resulted in some significant changes in terms of the game's gameplay and cast. On May 26, 2011, THQ announced they would be publishing Turtle Rock's next major title. On June 10, 2011, THQ described Turtle Rock's next title as "wild".

At that time, THQ had already been in a financial crisis that had begun in 2010, and declared bankruptcy on December 19, 2012. Their game, Evolve, was listed, alongside other unannounced titles from: Relic Entertainment, Vigil Games, and THQ Studios Montreal in court documents filed by THQ. With THQ unable to continue its publishing and funding roles, an auction was held for other publishers to acquire these titles. Publishers interested in the game visited Turtle Rock Studio to see its "secret project". The company's founders felt frustrated, and Rubin later suggested that Turtle Rock bid $250,000 for its own project, which Ashton described as "what [they] had in the bank". However, they were outbid by Take-Two Interactive, which paid $11 million to acquire the game and to secure the rights to the entire franchise. According to Turtle Rock, they were "super excited" to work with Take-Two. The game was set to be published under Take-Two's publishing label 2K Games, and was introduced on January 7, 2014 by gaming magazine Game Informer. During the game's development, the team's size expanded to 75 staff members. Originally the game was to be released in October 2014, however 2K later delayed the release date to allow Turtle Rock to further polish the game. Evolve was released worldwide on February 10, 2015, for Microsoft Windows, PlayStation 4, and Xbox One platforms. While Evolve received generally positive reviews, the player base quickly dwindled. The PC version briefly transitioned to become a free-to-play title, but 2K ultimately decided to end the game's support.

In December 2016, Turtle Rock announced that the company was working on a new intellectual property to be published by Perfect World Entertainment. The studio would also consider releasing titles via Steam's early access program, which allows players to provide feedback on unfinished games or products as they are being developed. However, Turtle Rock later revealed that the game had been cancelled and that both studios agreed to part ways.

The studio focused on creating VR titles from 2016-2019, with noted titles including Face Your Fears 1 + 2, RPG Journey of the Gods and other virtual reality titles, while working with Warner Bros. Interactive Entertainment on Back 4 Blood, a new zombie co-op FPS in the vein of Left 4 Dead, which released for Windows, PlayStation 4, PlayStation 5, Xbox One and Xbox Series X/S on October 12, 2021.

=== As Tencent studio (2021–present) ===
Slamfire Inc., the parent company of Turtle Rock Studios, was acquired by Tencent in December 2021 for undisclosed terms. The studio will remain autonomous under Tencent's ownership.

== List of games ==
Turtle Rock Studios is best known for their work on Valve's Counter-Strike and Left 4 Dead franchises. Works include:

| Year | Game | Publisher | Platform(s) | | | | | | | | | | | | | |
| Year | Game | Publisher | Win | Mac | Lin | Xbox | X360 | PS4 | PS5 | XBO | XS | iOS | Android | Oculus Go | Oculus Quest | Nintendo Switch |
|---|---|---|---|---|---|---|---|---|---|---|---|---|---|---|---|---|
| 2003 | Counter-Strike (Xbox port) | Microsoft Game Studios | No | No | No | Yes | No | No | No | No | No | No | No | No | No | No |
| 2004 | Counter-Strike: Condition Zero | Sierra Entertainment | Yes | Yes | Yes | No | No | No | No | No | No | No | No | No | No | No |
| 2004 | Counter-Strike: Source | Valve | Yes | Yes | Yes | No | No | No | No | No | No | No | No | No | No | No |
| 2008 | Left 4 Dead | Valve | Yes | Yes | No | No | Yes | No | No | No | No | No | No | No | No | No |
| 2009 | Left 4 Dead 2: The Passing | Valve | Yes | Yes | Yes | No | Yes | No | No | No | No | No | No | No | No | No |
| 2010 | Left 4 Dead: The Sacrifice | Valve | Yes | Yes | No | No | Yes | No | No | No | No | No | No | No | No | No |
| 2010 | Left 4 Dead 2: The Sacrifice | Valve | Yes | Yes | Yes | No | Yes | No | No | No | No | No | No | No | No | No |
| 2010 | Leap Sheep! | Valve | No | No | No | No | No | No | No | No | No | Yes | Yes | No | No | No |
| 2015 | Evolve | 2K Games | Yes | No | No | No | No | Yes | No | Yes | No | No | No | No | No | No |
| 2016 | Evolve Stage 2 | 2K Games | Yes | No | No | No | No | No | No | No | No | No | No | No | No | No |
| 2016 | Face Your Fears | Oculus Studios | Yes | No | No | No | No | No | No | No | No | No | No | Yes | No | No |
| 2017 | The Well | Oculus Studios | No | No | No | No | No | No | No | No | No | No | No | Yes | No | No |
| 2019 | Face Your Fears 2 | Oculus Studios | Yes | No | No | No | No | No | No | No | No | No | No | No | Yes | No |
| 2019 | Journey of the Gods | Oculus Studios | Yes | No | No | No | No | No | No | No | No | No | No | No | Yes | No |
| 2021 | Back 4 Blood | Warner Bros. Interactive Entertainment | Yes | No | No | No | No | Yes | Yes | Yes | Yes | No | No | No | No | No |

=== Left 4 Dead ===
Left 4 Dead is a first-person shooter survival horror video game released in November 2008 for Microsoft Windows and Xbox 360. Valve led the game's development, with assistance provided by Turtle Rock. It puts emphasis on co-operative gameplay, in which players must fight against zombies in order to complete levels. In addition, the game features a mode called Versus mode, in which a team of four players play as the survivors who compete against a team of four players who play as the special infected characters such as the Smoker, Hunter, Boomer and Tank. The game alternates the rounds per stage making each team of four play both the survivor characters and the special infected characters. The game was built atop the most advanced version of the Source Engine available at the time and introduced version 2 of Turtle Rock's AI technology, which had since been updated from the AI used for the bots in Condition Zero. The game was released on Microsoft Windows and the Xbox 360 in November 2008. The game received critical acclaim. The PC version of the game received an 89 out of 100 from Metacritic, a review aggregator. The title was thought to have redefined co-operative gameplay. The success of Left 4 Dead led Valve to develop Left 4 Dead 2, the next installment in the series. Alongside its sequel, the franchise had collectively sold 12 million copies as of October 1, 2012.

=== Evolve ===
Evolve was Turtle Rock's next major project after Left 4 Dead. Published by 2K Games and powered by CryEngine 3, the title is an asymmetrical multiplayer game which pits four players, who play as hunters in a first-person perspective, against a player who plays as a monster in a third-person view. An alpha version of the game was released on January 15, 2015. The full version was released on February 10, 2015 for Microsoft Windows, PlayStation 4 and Xbox One. While the game received generally positive reviews, its extensive list of downloadable content available at launch caused controversy. Nevertheless, the game shipped 2.5 million copies as of May 18, 2015, and was considered as another "permanent IP" by owner Take-Two Interactive. Evolve became a free-to-play game in July 2016. On September 3, 2018, Evolve's dedicated servers shut down.

=== Back 4 Blood ===
Turtle Rock announced Back 4 Blood in March 2019. Though inspired by Valve's Left 4 Dead games, Back 4 Blood is a wholly original intellectual property, though still sees players working cooperatively to fight through a zombie apocalypse. The game also has a player-versus-player mode. The game was released on October 12, 2021, for Steam and Xbox Game Pass, to generally positive critical reviews but mixed public opinion. Published by Warner Bros. Interactive Entertainment for Windows, PlayStation 4, PlayStation 5, Xbox One and Xbox Series X/S.
