= Mike Booth =

American video game designer

- Occupations: Chief Creative Officer at Bad Robot Games; Former founder and CEO of Turtle Rock Studios
- Board member of: Resolution Games

Michael Booth is an American video game designer and executive and the current chief creative officer of Bad Robot Games. He was also creator and lead designer of Left 4 Dead and founder of Turtle Rock Studios, later acquired by Valve Corporation.

== Early career and Nox ==
Throughout his career, Booth has generally focused on creating cooperative online multiplayer games, a genre for which he continues to advocate as recently as 2022. One of Booth's earliest projects was Nox, which he created in his apartment. He brought a demo to the Game Developers Conference, and ultimately, Nox was published in 2000 through the Westwood Studios division of Electronic Arts, with Booth in the roles of project lead and lead designer. His career at Electronic Arts continued with Booth serving creative roles for 2000's Command & Conquer: Yuri's Revenge and 2003's Command & Conquer: Generals.

== Turtle Rock Studios ==
In 2002, Booth founded Turtle Rock Studios, where he served as CEO and game director. In 2003, Booth programmed an official bot that enabled offline multiplayer play in Counter-Strike. He was project lead and lead designer for Counter-Strike: Condition Zero, released in 2004. In 2004 he began creating cooperative online game Left 4 Dead, for which he was also lead designer. Booth created the AI Director in Left 4 Dead that dynamically adjusted a player's experience of the game during each playthrough.

Booth also was part of the creative teams for other Counter-Strike games and Team Fortress 2. After Valve acquired Turtle Rock Studios in 2008, Booth stayed on with the company until 2012.

== Blizzard Entertainment, Facebook, and Resolution Games ==
Booth departed Valve and joined Blizzard Entertainment as game director on an unannounced project.

From December 2015 until December 2019, he was director of social virtual reality (VR) at Facebook, working with CEO Mark Zuckerberg and chief technology officer Mike Schroepfer. In April 2017, Booth led the beta rollout of Facebook Spaces, a social VR product created for Oculus Rift. Prior to the launch, Booth appeared in live VR demonstrations of the product in April and October 2016.

Booth joined the board of directors of Resolution Games in March 2020. He worked with Resolution on Demeo, a 2021 tabletop role-playing game originally created for VR.

== Bad Robot Games ==
Booth joined Bad Robot Games in December 2020, managing the company's newly created in-house development studio. He reports to Anna Sweet, CEO of Bad Robot Games. By February 2022, he had taken on the role of chief creative officer.

== Awards and recognition ==
- Booth's game Left 4 Dead received eight nominations at the 12th Annual Interactive Achievement Awards, winning Outstanding Achievement in Online Game Play and Computer Game of the Year.
- Booth, along with Left 4 Dead creatives Gabe Newell and Chet Faliszek, won the British Academy Games Award for Multiplayer in 2009.
- Demeo, which Booth creative directed, was nominated for the D.I.C.E. Award for Immersive Reality Game of the Year.
