= Amy Kavanagh =

British disability activist

- Education: King's College London
- Occupations: Activist; Advocate

Amy Kavanagh is a British disability rights activist and advocate. Kavanagh is registered as blind, and was born with a complex visual impairment called ocular albinism, which has led to her vision loss. In 2017 she became known as a disability campaigner, after she began writing online about her experiences navigating the world as a blind Londoner alongside her guide dog, Ava. Kavanagh started a social media campaign, #JustAskDontGrab, to encourage people to ask for consent before offering assistance. Kavanagh was a finalist in the Royal National Institute for the Blind See Differently Awards 2019, and her campaign was awarded the Campaign of the Year at the Transport for All Awards 2020.

== Education and career ==
Kavanagh graduated in 2017 with a PhD from King's College London, after achieving a first class degree at the University of Leeds in 2010. As policy and public affairs advisor for Sense, The National Deafblind and Rubella Association, she championed the rights of people living with complex disabilities, including those who are deafblind, at a local and national levels. Other experience includes roles at CLIC Sargent, fundraiser campaign Listen, and universities. Kavanagh currently works as a freelance disability consultant and an advocate for inclusion.

== Media influence ==
Kavanagh has written and spoken about the impact on disabled people of social distancing and the 'new normal' including an interview on BBC Woman's Hour in June 2020. She has written for the Huffington Post, Metro News, The Times Red Box, and The i Paper.

During the global COVID-19 pandemic Kavanagh set up The Staying Inn, intended as an accessible, inclusive online space for disabled and non-disabled people to stay connected during the crisis.

Kavanagh is a video gamer and streamer. Under the name of 'Blind Button Masher' she advocates for greater accessibility in gaming, and spoke at the ninth Global Accessibility Awareness Day (GAAD) conference in May 2020.
