= Left 4 Dead (franchise) =

Video game series

- Genres: First-person shooter; Survival horror
- Developers: Turtle Rock Studios (2008); Valve (2009)
- Publishers: Valve; Electronic Arts (Xbox 360)
- First release: Left 4 Dead; November 17, 2008
- Latest release: Left 4 Dead 2 November 17, 2009

Left 4 Dead is a series of cooperative first-person shooter survival horror video games created by Turtle Rock Studios and published by Valve and Electronic Arts. Set in the days after a pandemic outbreak of a viral strain transforming people into zombie-like feral creatures, the games follow the adventures of four survivors attempting to reach safe houses and military rescue while fending off the attacking hordes.

The games encourage cooperative play between up to four players, each taking the role of one of the survivor characters and the computer controlling any unassigned characters. Players use a combination of melee weapons, firearms, and thrown objects to fend off attacks from the bulk of the infected creatures, while using an assortment of healing items to keep their group alive. Certain unique infected creatures pose a more difficult challenge, requiring teamwork to take down effectively. The games are overseen by an "AI Director", designed to give the players a more dramatic experience based on their performance, penalizing players for stalling while rewarding players with special weapons by taking longer or riskier paths. The Director also makes gameplay dynamic, meaning that no two playthroughs are quite the same.

== Video games ==
Release timeline
| 2008 | Left 4 Dead |
| 2009 | Crash Course DLC |
| 2009 | Left 4 Dead 2 |
| 2010 | The Passing DLC |
| 2010 | The Sacrifice DLC |
2011
| 2012 | Cold Stream DLC |
2013
2014
2015
2016
2017
2018
2019
| 2020 | The Last Stand DLC |

- Left 4 Dead was released in November 2008. The game's development was started by Turtle Rock Studios, who were bought by Valve during the game's creation, with continued development occurring at Valve's studios.
- Left 4 Dead 2 was released a year later in November 2009. Valve attributed the short turnaround between the titles as a result of having many ideas to expand on the first game, but more than could be reasonably done through software patching or downloadable content. The fast turnaround of the sequel was initially criticized by many players of the first game, leading to a temporary effort to boycott the second game. Valve helped to placate matters, demonstrating that it was still developing content for the first game, including a crossover campaign, "The Passing", between the characters of both games.

=== Downloadable content ===
- Crash Course is the first downloadable content (DLC) campaign for Left 4 Dead. It is free on PC, but not for Xbox 360. It was released on September 29, 2009. According to Valve it is meant to bridge the gap between No Mercy and Death Toll.
- The Passing is the first DLC crossover campaign of Left 4 Dead 2, which includes a new campaign and "new co-operative challenge modes of play" and introduces a new firearm, the M60; the Golf Club, and a new Uncommon Infected called the Fallen Survivor. It was released April 22, 2010.
- The Sacrifice is a three-chapter DLC for both Left 4 Dead and Left 4 Dead 2 and was released on October 5, 2010. Taking place after Blood Harvest and is considered to be the prologue to The Passing, as both campaigns are connected to each other.
- Cold Stream is the third DLC for Left 4 Dead 2. It was announced in a blog post on February 16, 2011. Cold Stream was released on March 22, 2011, in beta form on Steam, and it was officially released in its final form on Steam on July 24, 2012. Cold Stream was released on the Xbox Marketplace August 3, 2012 for 560MSP. It was created by map making community member Matthew Lourdelet and features various wall graffiti featuring the author's friends.
- The Last Stand is a community-made scenario for Left 4 Dead 2, and was released on September 24, 2020, with Valve's blessing as an official update to the game. The update includes over twenty new maps for survival mode, a new campaign, and additional updates to the game.

=== Spin-offs and crossovers ===
- The Mercenaries: No Mercy makes a return on the PC version of Resident Evil 6. As an exclusive to No Mercy, Capcom and game developer Valve had teamed up to allow Left 4 Dead 2 content for No Mercy. The content includes the main cast from Left 4 Dead 2 being playable characters with their own loadouts alongside the Witch and the Tank replacing the Bloodshot and the Napad as enemies.
- Pixel Force: Left 4 Dead is a downloadable indie game where the game is played as if it were released for NES.
- Left 4 Dead: Survivors (Left 4 Dead: 生存者たち, (Seizonshatachi)) is a version of Left 4 Dead 2 released on December 10, 2014, for Japanese arcades by Taito. The game features the same scenarios and locations as L4D2, but features a different cast of survivors unique to this edition.
- The No Mercy level of Left 4 Dead appeared as DLC for the cooperative-shooter Payday: The Heist and its sequel Payday 2.
- On August 20, 2015, a free update was released for the PC version of the game Zombie Army Trilogy which imported the eight survivor characters from the Left 4 Dead games.
- In March 2017, asymmetric horror game Dead by Daylight released the "Left Behind" DLC for PC, which unlocked Bill as a playable character. It also unlocked Zoey, Ellis, Francis and Rochelle costumes for Meg, Dwight, Jake and Claudette respectively.

=== Comics ===
Tied to the release of "The Sacrifice" downloadable content, a four-part web comic drawn by Michael Avon Oeming was released to describe the events of the first set of survivors, Bill, Louis, Zoey, and Francis, that led them to meet the second group, Coach, Ellis, Rochelle, and Nick. Each of the parts provides a backstory for each of the first survivor characters at the onset of the pandemic, and also follows directly up on the final campaign from the first game, "Blood Harvest", where the survivors, identified as carriers, are taken to a secure military facility. The use of the comic medium to expand the game's story outside of the game's bounds has been used by Valve before in promoting Team Fortress 2.

=== Merchandise and other products ===
Within Left 4 Dead 2, a fictional southern rock band called the Midnight Riders was introduced. Several songs have been produced for the game and tie-in promotions. Two of them, "Midnight Ride" and "One Bad Man", have appeared as downloadable content for the Rock Band series via the Rock Band Network.

Valve released a series of holiday cards themed after the survivors, created by Alexandria Neonakis. Three plush toys have been released based on the Left 4 Dead series' infected; first with the Boomer, and later with the Hunter and the Tank. They are to be followed by two more plush toys yet to be released. They were also created by Alexandria Neonakis. In June 2011, it was confirmed that Valve had signed a deal with NECA, to produce action figures, which includes Left 4 Dead and other Valve series. There are two figures produced so far, Left 4 Dead's Boomer (which was released in June), and Left 4 Dead 2's Smoker (which was released in November).

=== Cancelled sequel ===
Valve has not yet made any direct statement related to future games in the series, though Chet Faliszek said in 2012 that like Valve's other games, a sequel had not been ruled out. Rumors from 2013 through 2016 led players to believe that Valve was developing Left 4 Dead 3, with a target release date in 2017.

In April 2019, Tyler McVicker of Valve News Network reported that while Left 4 Dead 3 had been in development at some point at Valve, it had been subsequently cancelled a few years earlier. Assets that McVicker had obtained showed a level comparable to assets used in Counter-Strike: Global Offensive, and indicated that very little other work appeared to have been done on the title.

In July 2020, multimedia storybook The Final Hours of Half-Life: Alyx, which focused on the 2010s at Valve, gave information about the cancelled Left 4 Dead 3 project that was developed around 2013, describing it as an open-world game set in Morocco where the player fights hundreds of zombies. The project was shelved due to the slow development of the Source 2 engine.

At The Game Awards 2020, Turtle Rock announced Back 4 Blood, their spiritual successor to Left 4 Dead 2, released on 12 October 2021.

== Setting ==
The Left 4 Dead games take place in the days following a pandemic outbreak of an infection that transforms humans into feral, zombie-like creatures, seeking to kill those yet to be infected. Within the United States, the Civil Emergency and Defense Agency (CEDA) orders the creation of safe zones with the aid of the military, and evacuates as many people as possible to these areas, aiming to transfer them to islands and ocean-going ships, as the infected are unable to cross bodies of water. A number of people are discovered to be immune to the infection, though they can carry and unintentionally spread it to others. In both games, four of these "Carriers" or otherwise just immune humans, meet and become the game's "Survivor" characters, making their way to safe houses and extraction points.

== Characters ==
- The first game follows four survivors as they travel from Pennsylvania to Georgia. The game's four Survivors are:
  - William "Bill" Overbeck: an old Vietnam War veteran. Voiced by Jim French.
  - Louis: a frazzled IT analyst. The most optimistic of the four. Voiced by Earl Alexander.
  - Francis: an obnoxious and insolent outlaw biker who hates everything, except for vests. Voiced by Vince Valenzuela.
  - Zoey: a college student who loves horror movies. Voiced by Jen Taylor.
- The second game follows another group as they travel from Savannah, Georgia to New Orleans, Louisiana, and features four new Survivors:
  - Coach: a portly high school football coach. Voiced by Chad L. Coleman.
  - Ellis: an overly talkative mechanic. Voiced by Eric Ladin.
  - Nick: a pessimistic gambler and con artist. Voiced by Hugh Dillon.
  - Rochelle: a low-level TV reporter. Voiced by Rochelle Aytes and modeled on Shanola Hampton.
- The Japanese arcade version of the second game follows the same route and story, but features four Survivors exclusive to the Arcade edition:
  - Yusuke: a Japanese college student visiting America on vacation. Voiced by Ryuichi Kijima.
  - Haruka: a Japanese schoolgirl visiting America on a school trip. Voiced by Ayane Sakura.
  - Sara: a Japanese-American tour guide. Voiced by Miyuki Sawashiro.
  - Blake: an American bartender and army veteran. Voiced by Hidenori Takahashi.

== Gameplay ==
The Left 4 Dead games are first-person shooters incorporating survival horror elements. A player controls one of the four Survivor characters, and has the ability to move, jump, and use weapons in their possession. Players are limited to two weapons: a main firearm with limited ammunition taken from ammo caches, and either one (or two pistols) sidearm with unlimited ammunition or a melee weapon. Players also have three additional inventory slots. The third slot gives the player a thrown weapon, including a Molotov cocktail, a pipe bomb that can be used to lure a horde towards it before it explodes, or a bile jar that can be used to lure a horde to a specific area. The fourth slot provides for either a health kit which they can use on themselves or the other survivors, a defibrillator to revive a dead Survivor, or a special ammo deployment kit providing unique ammo such as explosive bullets. The fifth inventory slot is used for pain pills, giving the player a temporary health boost, or an adrenaline shot, temporarily increasing the player's movement, interaction, healing, and teammate revival speed. Some environmental objects like propane tanks or gasoline cans can be carried and thrown at hordes, upon which they can be fired upon as a makeshift explosive, but cannot be stored in the player's inventory. In Left 4 Dead 2, limited-use weapons such as the chainsaw, grenade launcher or the M60 machine gun can also be carried in a similar manner. The player can use whatever object they are holding to temporarily push back any Infected surrounding them.

A health bar is used to track each character's health; players are aware of the state of each other's health and special items, and each character is shown to other players through an outlined silhouette on the game's HUD, regardless of walls that separate the characters, and colored based on their health state. A character's health suffers from attacks from any Infected, environmental effects such as fires, and from friendly-fire incidents. When a character's health falls below a certain level, the character will not be able to move as fast until they can restore their health. If the player's health drops to zero, they become incapacitated, whereby they fall to the floor and need to be helped up by a teammate, and a new temporary health bar appears, representing a bleed out period. Should this bar drop to zero, the character dies, and can only be restored either through a defibrillator, appearing later in a level in a "rescue closet" from which they must be freed, or when the remaining players reach the safe house. Otherwise, an incapacitated character can be revived with the assistance of any other character. However, if a character becomes incapacitated three times in a row without using a first-aid kit, they will immediately die the third time. Similarly, if a character falls over an edge, they will hang precariously for a limited time, falling to their death if they are not assisted in time.

In the main campaign mode, each campaign is divided into two to five chapters. For all but the last chapter, the goal of the players is to reach the safehouse at the end of the level, where fresh supplies of weapons, ammo, and health items are typically found. In the finale, the campaign comes to a climax and requires the players to either make a stand against waves of Infected as they wait for a rescue vehicle, fill up an escape vehicle's gas tank while fending off the horde, or race through a gauntlet of Infected to make their way to the rescue point.

Additional game modes are also available. A 4-on-4 competitive mode named Versus is available, where in alternating matches, one side controls the Survivor characters while the other controls Special Infected. When playing as the Survivors, the goal remains the same as the normal campaign mode. The Infected side tries to prevent the Survivors from making their way to the safehouse; should they be killed by the survivors, they will respawn later as a new type of Infected. Scoring is based on how far the Survivors get and other factors, with the team with the most points at the end of a campaign considered the winner. Other modes are based on single-situation standoffs where the Survivors have to hold out as long as possible, or where two teams compete to fill a generator with as many gas cans as possible.

In Left 4 Dead 2 two additional modes have been introduced. In "Realism" mode, several of the video game aspects are removed from the game, such as the identification of the location of teammates via their silhouette, the respawning of dead characters later in rescue closets, and more severe damage models. The sequel also features "mutations", game modes based on either the campaign or competitive modes where specific rules may be in place. For example, one mutation may give all the Survivor characters chainsaws from the start, while another may make every unique infected appear as a specific type, such as the Tank.

Both games support user-generated content through new maps and campaigns using tools provided by Valve; Left 4 Dead 2 also provides support for custom mutations. Valve has further supported the user community by highlighting popular third-party maps, and including select ones in software patches for the game.

=== AI Director ===
The Left 4 Dead series uses a collection of artificial intelligence routines, collectively the "AI Director", to monitor and alter the gameplay experience in response to the players. Valve's primary goal with the AI Director was to promote replayability of the games' campaigns, as their previous multiplayer games with this feature, such as Counter-Strike and Team Fortress 2 have shown thriving communities of players that continue to play the games despite the limited number of maps available due to the unpredictable nature of online play. In considering this for Left 4 Dead, Valve identified that many games use static events that always occur at fixed points in a level, or limited dynamic events where one of several events could occur at fixed points. Valve themselves had used this idea in some key battles in Half-Life 2: Episode Two where the spawning of Combine forces would be based on the player's location. They recognized that such systems do not promote replayability or cooperation: players could easily memorize where events would occur, and those that had yet to experience the events would slow other players down. With the concept of the AI Director, Valve believed it could capture the same chaos and randomness that would occur in Counter-Strike and Team Fortress 2 in the cooperative gameplay experience, transforming it from simple memorization to a skills challenge. Valve has further termed this approach "procedural narrative", creating a new story each time the game is played.

The AI Director has several facets that combine to form "structured unpredictability" for each playthrough. The Director first procedurally generates a dramatic flow for the level, which identifies the size and location of hordes of common infected and uncommon infected throughout the level. The procedural generation considers each traversable area on the map, using pathfinding algorithms that Valve had incorporated into Counter-strike computer-controlled characters, and the "flow" of the map—the general direction from the start of the level to the safe house. As players progress through the map, the Director will spawn infected in areas near the players and out of sight, while removing infected from earlier portions of the map the players have passed through. The placement also considered the "Escape Route", the shortest path through the map, and will increase encounters along this route to increase the difficulty. Spawning rules are different for each of the infected; hordes are more often spawned behind players to take them by surprise, while special infected like the Hunter and Smoker will spawn ahead of the players, giving their individual AI the opportunity to lay in wait for the players. Procedural generation is also used to place weapons and other items throughout the level. Weapons and equipment can be programmed by the map designer to be generated by the Director at fixed points, allowing for some predictability for the players, and to give some creative control to the design for story-telling and visual effects.

Overriding the procedural generation is the aim to create "active dynamic pacing" of the game by continuous monitoring of players, and altering the predetermined pacing to react to this. Each player character is tracked by a metric called the Survivor Intensity, which increases as the character takes damage, becomes incapacitated, or another character dies nearby, among other effects, and slowly decays in time. The Director will alter its previously developed schedule for spawning of infected to build up Survivor Intensity to a certain threshold; when this occurs, the game sustains this peak for a few seconds, then enters a period where it relaxes and reduces the spawning of infected, allowing the players to finish their current encounter and allow their Survivor Intensities to fall away from the threshold. The Director then repeats this cycle until the players have reached the end of the level.

The boss infected encounters are generated through different means, creating a sequence based on cycling without repetition between three situations: Tank, Witch, or "No event". Boss events are then generated based on the number of areas the players have passed through. These events are not modified by the dynamic pacing of the game; Valve discovered when these were controlled by the pacing, players would often be at too high of an intensity to allow these encounters to occur. Keeping the events on a separate track allows the pacing to be unpredictable, further enhancing the replayability goal of the Director.

A sample series of encounters (with progress from left to right) during a level playthrough of Left 4 Dead. The top bar shows the original population of common (white icons), special (colored icons) and boss (large icons) procedurally generated by the AI Director prior to starting the level. The second bar is the monitored "Survivor Intensity", with the red "Relax" sections occurring immediately after the Intensity reaches a threshold limit. The third bar is the actual population generated while playing the level; certain common hordes have been removed due to the Intensity being high and in a "relaxed" state, while other hordes and uncommons have been added when the Intensity is very low near the end of the level.

The Director also creates mood and tension with emotional cues, such as visual effects, audio cues for specific types of infected, and character communication. Within Left 4 Dead 2, the Director has the ability to alter placement of walls, level layout, lighting, and weather conditions, and reward players for taking more difficult routes with more useful weapons and items. A dedicated Director routine dynamically controls music and other ambient sound effects, monitoring what a player has experienced to create an appropriate sound mix. The process is client-side and done by a multi-track system. Each player hears their own mix, which is being generated as they play through the game, and dead players watching a teammate hear their teammates' mix.

Valve sees the AI Director as a tool to be used for other games. A software patch for the cooperative game Alien Swarm added a game mode, Onslaught, that used a version of the AI Director from Left 4 Dead to dynamically generate enemies for the players to fight.

Valve has investigated the use of biofeedback from the players directly as input for the Director. At the 2011 Game Developers Conference, Valve demonstrated a simple test where a player, fitted with a device to measure skin conductance level, played through a Left 4 Dead 2 level. Certain in-game actions, such as hearing a threatening noise or passing an opening doorway, would cause the skin conductance to rise. Valve postulates that such information fed into the Director could create a much more effective player experience.

=== Infected characters ===
The Infected characters within the game are divided into four categories. The most abundant are the "Common" Infected, the least deformed of the infected creatures. Alone, these infected are weak, but in large numbers, they pose a significant threat to the Survivors. Often, the Director will engineer a "horde", where a large number of Common Infected charge the players. Hordes can also be created by setting off in-game "crescendo events" that usually involve some loud noise created by the players, or by activating a car alarm. As such, many individual levels feature a unique, noisy event, such as the raising of a rusty elevator, where a very large horde will be attracted, with the players given forewarning so that they can prepare for the onslaught.

A second type of infected introduced in Left 4 Dead 2, are the "Uncommon Infected". Uncommon infected are unique to certain campaigns and have a special ability that can hamper the players' progress. For example, the Uncommon Infected in "Hard Rain" are infected road workers that are still wearing protective ear pieces, making them immune to the sound of pipe bombs.

The third type of Infected are the "Special Infected". Each of these creatures appear less frequently during a campaign, and are designed to keep the players working together as a team. A Survivor that is attacked by these Special Infected is rendered completely incapable of taking action, encapsulating their intent: the victim must be rescued by other Survivors as they cannot help themselves. Special Infected have very specific vocalizations, as well as leitmotifs which are inserted into the game's soundtrack when the AI Director places one, allowing Survivor players some forewarning. They serve as playable characters for the Infected in the games' Versus and Scavenge modes.

- Hunter - a nimble and agile Infected that wears a hoodie and is able to leap large distances and pounce on a single Survivor, who will take damage until either they are killed or the Hunter is either killed or shoved off.
- Smoker - an Infected with a long tongue that he uses to ensnare and strangle Survivors, rendering them helpless until the tongue is hit or the Smoker is killed or stunned with explosives or shoving. When killed, he leaves a cloud of smoke that temporarily obscures the Survivors' vision and makes them cough.
- Boomer - a slow-moving bloated Infected that vomits bile onto Survivors; though not harmful itself, the bile attracts Common Infected to the character and obscures their vision for a time. When killed, a Boomer explodes, covering any nearby Survivors in more bile.
- Spitter - an Infected that spews a large amount of acidic "spit" at the Survivors. Survivors standing in the "goo" suffer quickly-increasing damage until they move out of the puddle. The Spitter herself is quite weak and upon her death, she leaves a small puddle of acid that also damages Survivors.
- Charger - an Infected with a large mutated arm that attacks by charging Survivors at high speed. The charge attack is capable of knocking down and effectively stunning every Survivor at once, and the Survivor at the forefront of the attack is carried as far as the Charger runs or until the Charger hits a wall, at which point the Charger begins to pummel the Survivor. Survivors being pummeled are completely helpless and will be killed unless the Charger is killed. The Charger is also unique among the Special Infected in that, due to his hulking size, cannot be shoved; only frag rounds and explosives can stumble a Charger.
- Jockey - a small Infected with a hunchback that can "ride" a Survivor, hence the name. A Jockey can control a Survivor's movement while riding them, steering the Survivor into danger. A Survivor suffers damage as long as a Jockey rides them and is completely helpless unless they are incapacitated or the Jockey is shoved or killed.

Finally, there are two special "boss" Infected characters that the AI Director includes at rare moments:

- The Witch - a female Infected with glowing eyes and long clawed fingers. Witches are unique in that they are passive, preferring to be left alone to cry. However, if a Survivor "startles" her, either with their flashlight, by invading her space, or by damaging her, she will charge that Survivor and automatically incapacitate them. Once incapacitated, the Witch will viciously attack the downed Survivor until either they are killed or she is, or if she changes targets by being set on fire. If she kills the Survivor who initially disturbed her, then she will run away. On higher difficulty levels, a Witch can automatically kill a Survivor. She is particularly durable, and can run faster than Survivors, making it difficult to slay her before someone takes damage. She is the strongest and fastest Infected on foot. However, she has the second most hit points, behind the Tank. She can be stunned by explosives and frag rounds.
- The Tank - an enormous Infected with superhuman strength. The Tank can punch Survivors and smash them to the floor, or can throw debris and rocks, or punch cars, dumpsters, and other large objects at them (the latter resulting in instant incapacitation). Kiting is a valid tactic, but Survivors must do so for an extended period of time: a Tank on Normal difficulty has ten times the health of all the Survivors combined. In Versus, players may not control the Witch, and may only play as a Tank if the AI Director has already chosen to spawn one. He is the second strongest infected and has the highest number of hit points by far over all of the other infected. Due to his gargantuan size, the Tank can only be stumbled by exploding Boomers, oxygen canisters or propane tanks.

== Legacy ==
The Left 4 Dead series has a considerably large and active fanbase; a large amount of community-made content are available for the two games, with The Last Stand, a content expansion in particular being blessed by Valve and released as an official update for Left 4 Dead 2.

=== Purple Francis ===
Purple Francis is a nonexistent protagonist in the series, created as a hoax by two teenagers on February 12, 2021 on the Left 4 Dead community wiki, which subsequently received a cult following within the fanbase for its dedication and convincing "integration" into the series' lore. The hoax consisted of a series of vandalistic edits to the Left 4 Dead wiki, describing a nonexistent playable character named "Purple Francis," who is visually a picture of Francis edited with a purple hue. The edits provided detailed nonexistent lore, and cross-references to over a dozen edited pages, where Purple Francis was discussed in detail alongside other existing characters. Said lore is highly absurd and nonsensical in nature, such as his birth in a candle factory and turning purple through an iron-rich diet, which made him "incredibly attractive to women", and that he has a daughter who had an affair with Ronald Reagan. "Real life events" caused by his "existence" included ten players passed out after hearing his voice in the game for the first time and that he was later removed from retail copies of the game by Valve "due to negative feedback". "Screenshots" of Purple Francis were also supplied, depicting the character crudely photoshopped into existing artwork throughout the wiki.

While the edits were eventually reverted a few days after creation, the Left 4 Dead fan community seemed to embrace the concept of Purple Francis, and a mod on Steam Workshop was released on February 14 by a developer who had worked on The Last Stand update, claiming to restore the "cut content" depicting Purple Francis. The original creators of Purple Francis were later identified as "Lucy" and "Unknowntrope," two teenagers who had originally come up with the concept for humor.

== See also ==
- Back 4 Blood — a game made by Turtle Rock Studios, Included some developers that worked on Left 4 Dead.
- The Walking Dead — a game made by Telltale Games was planned to be a Left 4 Dead spin-off early in development.
- Payday 2, A game often compared to Left 4 Dead.
