= Left 4 Dead: The Sacrifice =

2010 digital comic book

- Navigational image for The Sacrifice, with each character image linking to one part of the comic
- Story: The Sacrifice (Left 4 Dead) (Chet Faliszek and Jay Pinkerton)
- Ink: Michael Avon Oeming
- Date: September 14, 2010
- Hero: Bill, Francis, Louis, and Zoey
- Pages: 178
- First publication: The Sacrifice - Part One

The Sacrifice is a digital comic book created by Valve based on the Left 4 Dead video game, detailing the events that the protagonists – Zoey, Louis, Francis, and Bill – experience after the chronologically-final campaign, Blood Harvest. It accompanies a campaign in both Left 4 Dead and Left 4 Dead 2 of the same name. It also serves as a prequel to a campaign from Left 4 Dead 2 called The Passing, which makes allusions to the events.

== Synopsis ==
The Sacrifice takes place after the "Blood Harvest" campaign of the first Left 4 Dead game, and leads up to the events of "The Sacrifice" downloadable campaign for Left 4 Dead 2. Interspersed within the story are flashbacks showing the events that each Survivor experienced a short time "after First Infection"; watching friends, loved ones, and strangers turn into zombie-like creatures before their eyes and each realizing they are immune to the Infection.

From the end of "Blood Harvest", the four Survivors — Zoey, Louis, Francis, and Bill — are rescued by the U.S. Army and taken to Millhaven, a well-fortified army base. They are immediately split up; Francis and Louis are put into an isolation room, while Bill and Zoey are tested by a doctor. All four learn that they are "Carriers", having the virus yet showing no symptoms. Zoey herself is horrified to learn that her father, who requested her to kill him before he turned, had the Carrier gene, meaning that his death could have been avoided. They describe to Lt. Mora how the Infection has mutated to create "Special" Infected with unique abilities. Though Lt. Mora agrees with the Survivors' reports (having seen the Special Infected himself), his superior, Everly, is highly skeptical and refuses to take steps to consider evacuating the base despite not receiving orders for the last nine days. Mora becomes concerned that the Survivors may be on the side of the Infected, and privately discusses plans to evacuate the facility.

Mora overthrows Everly and sounds the evac alarm, unintentionally drawing Infected that attack the base, including several Special Infected able to breach the base's defense. As Mora's squad attempts to hold back the Infected, Bill, Zoey, Louis, and Francis, along with two befriended soldiers and a doctor (who is also immune), attempt to make their way to a nearby trainyard to a train south towards Florida. As they are escaping, Mora, injured and infected from battle, attempts to stop the group, believing them responsible for the invasion; but Bill knocks him down. As they discover a train, Everly attempts to escape in a helicopter, but a Tank sends it crashing to the ground. Finding an available train, the group becomes concerned that it has become too quiet, and Zoey suggests there is something lying in wait for them. They are soon attacked by a Tank and a horde of Infected. The two soldiers rejoin the military holding out at a choke point before heading to an outpost, leaving the group in fear of their masks failing, but are presumably killed when the choke point is overwhelmed. While the four Survivors are able to board in time, the doctor lags behind; to Zoey's dismay and anger, Bill refuses to slow down, stating that "we come back for our own".

As they travel south, Bill explains that his plan is to get them to the islands of the Florida Keys; as the Infected cannot swim, they will be safe there. At a town at the end of the line, they start searching for a boat. While navigating the town, Zoey explains to Francis that she does not understand Bill; Francis says that "Bill doesn't always do the right thing, but he does it for the right reasons". Shortly after, they find a yacht, but Louis is severely injured when he finds it packed with Witches. After burning the yacht, the group finds a sailboat filled with provisions and medicine; however, to get it downriver, they must raise a rusty old bridge blocking their path. They start nearby generators and prepare to fight the horde while waiting for the bridge to be raised, but soon the nearest generator gives out. Bill, without pause, jumps off the bridge and makes his way to the generator, restarting it as three Tanks strike him and maul him to death. Francis attempts to go after Bill but Zoey stops him, sadly commenting that Bill's sacrifice will have been for nothing. After waiting for the horde to disperse, the three quietly return to the boat and set course to the Keys.

== History ==
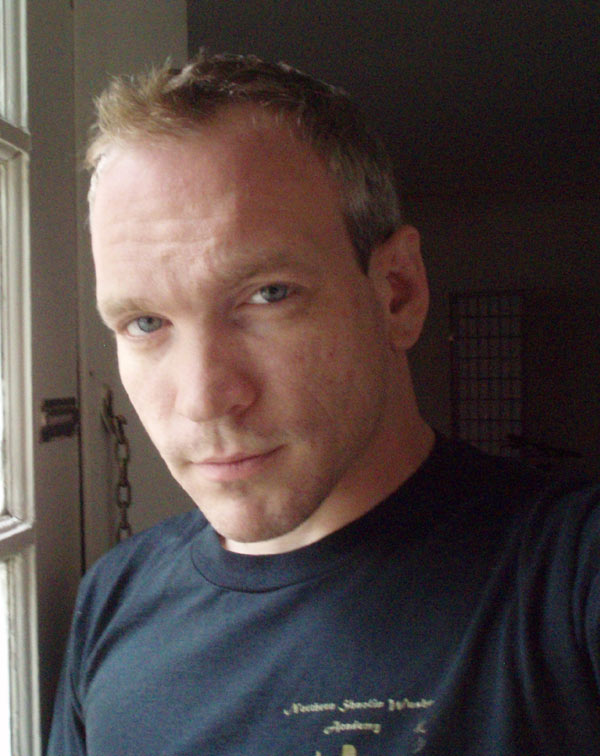
Comic book veteran Michael Avon Oeming was brought on by Valve in hopes of creating a quality product based on Left 4 Dead.

The comics were illustrated by Michael Avon Oeming, a comic books veteran. Valve stated that the comic was made both because it wants to expand its video games into other mediums, as well as in response to both the critical reception that the Team Fortress 2 comics received and the commercial sales that the comic led to for Team Fortress 2. While the plot of The Sacrifice is canon, its creators Valve made a note that they did not want to force the plot into the game; as such, they designed the accompanying in-game campaign to choose how it ends. Valve commented that they hated to see video games made into bad films or comics, due to most of them being "disconnected from [the video game's] source", so they decided to make the comic in-house. They commissioned Oeming to illustrate their comic to allow the comic to reach a certain level of quality. While the comic began as smaller than the current size, it grew as they fleshed out certain parts, due to their enjoyment of the characters and their intention to "give each one time in the spotlight." Valve also explains that they feel that comics are a better format for video game adaptations than films; they state that when players get attached to a character, a comic book allows them to appreciate them more than a two-hour film versus spending "hours and hours, even hundreds of hours with them" with them in the video game. They add that comics help to go into stories that the game doesn't elaborate on.

Much of the comic's content was created before the comic was created; in particular, the flashback featuring Francis was one of the first thing that was written for him. Valve explains the addition of numerous supporting characters is due to the new format; where the video games only allowed for focus on the main characters, they could go more in depth on others and show the effects of the infection on the rest of the world. When asked why Bill was chosen to die, Valve explained that they wanted the sacrifice to be done by the most impacting and favourite character by both Valve and the community, as well as the fact that his story matched The Sacrifice well.

The Sacrifice was released in four parts. Valve released it in both downloadable PDF format or viewable on their web site. They specifically released versions of the comic without text or speech bubbles for the purpose of allowing fans to localize them into other languages. They added that this would allow fans to make their own dialogue for them. Valve announced that the best fan-made comics would be featured on the Left 4 Dead developer's blog. The first part was released on September 14, 2010. Each following part was released every week following, up until the release of The Sacrifice in the games. It was eventually released for the iOS items iPhone and iPad. When asked whether more comics would be made by Valve, they stated in the affirmative, specifically saying that "this isn't the last you will see of Left 4 Dead comics." The full comic was published by Dark Horse Comics in Valve Presents: The Sacrifice and Other Steam-Powered Stories, a volume along with other comics created by Valve for Team Fortress 2 and Portal 2, which was released in November 2011.

== Reception ==
GamesRadar's Tyler Nagata commented that, as of the second release, it was "pretty great," praising it for its "snarky dialogue and messy encounters with the special infected". Kotaku's Michael McWhertor recommended it for fans of the series. Wired's Gus Mastrapa praised the beginning of the comic for "capturing the frenetic action of the first-person shooter". He adds that while he prefers that the video games do not go too much into the story, stating that the "mystery makes the action feel that much more visceral", he praised the execution for expanding the narrative in an outside medium without ruining the mystery. Destructoid's Nick Chester called it "decent hype" for the upcoming Left 4 Dead campaign. PC Gamer described them as "thrilling". At the start of the comics' releases, Rock Paper Shotgun's Kieron Gillen expressed interest, citing illustrator Michael Avon Oeming's "fantastic" visual storytelling. With the release of the second comic, fellow Rock Paper Shotgun editor Alec Meer emphatically recommended that readers read it, expressing "mild frustration" with the wait for the next comic. In a poll of what readers of the comic would like to see The Sacrifice released in, the choices were, in order of popularity: TV, computer, mobile device, and print. The supporting characters introduced in the comic have received some positive reception, with Valve citing an email they received asking if Annie, one of the soldiers accompanying the survivors, survived the zombie horde.
