= Left 4 Dead 2 =

2009 video game

- Developer: Valve
- Publishers: Valve; Electronic Arts (Xbox 360)
- Designer: Mike Booth
- Writer: Chet Faliszek
- Composer: Mike Morasky
- Series: Left 4 Dead
- Engine: Source
- Platforms: Windows; Xbox 360; Mac OS X; Linux
- Release: November 17, 2009; 17 years ago: Windows, Xbox 360; NA: November 17, 2009; EU: November 20, 2009; Mac OS X; WW: October 5, 2010; Linux; WW: July 2, 2013
- Genres: First-person shooter, survival horror
- Modes: Single-player, multiplayer

Left 4 Dead 2 is a 2009 first-person shooter game by Valve. The sequel to Left 4 Dead (2008) and the second game in the Left 4 Dead series, it was released for Windows and Xbox 360 in November 2009, Mac OS X in October 2010, and Linux in July 2013.

Left 4 Dead 2 builds upon cooperatively focused gameplay and Valve's proprietary Source engine, the same game engine used in the original Left 4 Dead. Set during the aftermath of an apocalyptic pandemic, the game focuses on four new Survivors, fighting against hordes of zombies known as the Infected, who develop severe psychosis and act extremely aggressive. The Survivors must fight their way through five campaigns, interspersed with safe houses that act as checkpoints, with the goal of escape at each campaign's finale. The gameplay is procedurally altered by the "AI Director 2.0", which monitors the players' performance and adjusts the scenario to provide a dynamic challenge. Other new features include new types of Special Infected and an arsenal of melee weapons.

The game made its world premiere at E3 2009 with a trailer during the Microsoft press event. Prior to release, it received mixed critical and community reactions, and attracted an unusually high volume of controversy about its graphic content. In response, alterations were made to the cover art, but both Australia and Germany refused to rate the unmodified edition at the time of release (both have since been reclassified to R18+ and 18, respectively). Despite this, the game was met with positive critical reviews, and is considered to be one of the greatest video games ever made and one of the best multiplayer games.

== Gameplay ==
Like its predecessor, Left 4 Dead 2 is a first-person shooter with a heavy emphasis on cooperative gameplay. The game presents five new campaigns, each composed of three to five smaller levels. As in the first game, each campaign is presented in menus and loading screens as a film starring the four Survivors; and features, upon completing a campaign, a faux credits screen which acts as the final scoreboard for the players and recaps certain performance statistics for the group. In every campaign, most levels involve the Survivors attempting to reach a safe room and close the door once they are all safely inside. However, the final level in each campaign requires the Survivors to call for rescue and either survive a prolonged onslaught until rescue arrives, pass through an especially challenging gauntlet of Infected to reach an escape vehicle, or collect and utilize fuel cans to enable their escape.

Each Survivor can carry one each of five categories of equipment: primary weapons, secondary weapons, throwable weapons, major medical supplies (which also includes ammunition upgrades) and minor medical supplies. Primary weapons are divided down into four tiers based on their availability and attributes. Tier one weapons (such as the SMG and Chrome Shotgun) deal damage relatively slowly and serve as basic offensive weapons. Tier two weapons (such as the Assault Rifle and Combat Shotgun) deal damage faster and often appear in later maps of each chapter. The two tier three weapons (Grenade Launcher and M60) differ from tier one and two weapons both because of their rarity and because players cannot refill their ammunition from ammunition dumps. They deal damage quickly at the cost of limited ammo. Tier four weapons are all mounted weapon systems and carry unlimited ammunition. The mounted weapons deal damage the fastest, but at the cost of overheating after a period of non-stop use, being stuck in place, and not being able to defend from behind. The mounted weapons are in rigid positions in maps and have a fixed arc of fire. They cannot be given ammunition upgrades like other weapons and players cannot utilize the laser sights attachment with them. There are three types of secondary weapons available: melee weapons, small caliber pistols (that can be dual wielded) and large caliber pistols. Although melee weapons cause extra damage to Infected when struck, the Survivors can use any other weapon or item for weaker melee attacks that can push the Infected back. Players also carry a flashlight with infinite battery life, the use of which enables players to see in the dark (with the downside of the player gaining the attention of the Infected much faster). They may also carry a single first aid kit, special ammo pack, or a defibrillator in their major medical supply slot; in addition to either pain pills or an adrenaline shot in their minor medical supply slot. They may also carry a single throwable weapon—Molotov cocktails to set an area on fire; pipe bombs to attract any nearby Infected to the flashing light and sound it makes until it explodes; and jars of Boomer bile, which attracts Common Infected to whatever it hits (e.g. fires, Special Infected, each other).

To enable situational awareness of other Survivors, players are shown the health and status of their fellow survivors. If a player does not have direct sight of another Survivor (e.g. a wall is blocking their view of the others), they will be shown the Survivor's highlighted silhouette. The Survivors are also susceptible to friendly fire, forcing players to exercise caution when shooting or swinging their weapons. As Survivors take damage, they move more slowly; if a Survivor's health drops to zero, they are incapacitated and left to fight off the Infected using a handgun until rescued by another Survivor. If a Survivor dies, they remain dead until the next level, unless revived by a defibrillator, or, in Campaign or Singleplayer mode, reappear in a "Rescue Closet" to be freed by other Survivors. Should all Survivors die or be incapacitated, the game will end, at which point the players may restart that chapter or quit the game.

=== Game modes ===
Left 4 Dead 2 includes 4 core game modes:

- Campaign: up to four human players fight against the Infected to make their way through Campaign stages; any Survivor not controlled by a human player is controlled by the computer.
- Versus: up to four other human players take control of various Special Infected to try and prevent the Survivors from completing a stage. Special Infected are randomly assigned to Infected players; they cannot control the Witch or any Common Infected. Occasionally, as determined by the AI Director, certain players will become the Tank. The two teams swap sides once per stage, and are scored based on their stage progress as Survivors. If both teams make it to the saferoom with all four Survivors, a 25-point tiebreaker is awarded to the team that dealt the most combined damage as Special Infected.
- Survival: a timed challenge where the Survivors are trapped in a section of the campaign maps, and try to survive as long as possible against an unending onslaught of Infected.
- Scavenge: a new 4-on-4 mode that requires the Survivor players to collect and use as many fuel cans scattered about a level to fill up a power generator, while the Infected players attempt to stop them.

Non-PvP modes can also be started as Single-player modes allowing players to play without intrusion from human players, playing with three computer-controlled Survivor allies.

Left 4 Dead 2 also features a Realism mode, which can be enabled at any difficulty for either Campaign or Versus. This mode removes some of the video-game aspects from the gameplay: Survivors cannot see each other's silhouettes, and dead teammates can only be revived with defibrillators and will not respawn later in the level. Weapons and other items will only glow when the player is within a few feet, forcing the players to search the levels more thoroughly. Body shots do less damage. In addition, the Witch enemy can kill any Survivor she would have normally incapacitated (on difficulties other than Easy). Designed to force players to work closely together and rely on voice communication, Valve created Realism mode to give players a way "to be challenged as a team" without having to increase the difficulty level of the game.

Finally, in later versions of the game, there is a Mutation option, in which players can select from a menu of 30 variations, some singleplayer, some multiplayer (and some of the latter cooperative, some versus, or both). Each variation changes one or more major game dynamics, such as: constantly draining health, solo mode with no Survivor allies, death upon incapacitation, only one kind of weapon available, coop that later switches to versus, shooting or targeting constraints, an enemy type with increased power, increased numbers of Special Infected, etc. One of these modes, named GunBrain, is a weapons stats analyzer.

=== Enemies ===
While also referred to as zombies, the Infected are humans who have contracted a mutated strain of an infection, though neither the source nor nature of this "Green Flu" are made clear in the games. The most numerous Infected encountered by the survivors are the common Infected. Though individually weak, they can swarm and overwhelm the Survivors, especially when separated from their teammates. Damage to the Infected in Left 4 Dead 2 is portrayed more realistically, with bullets and melee weapons ripping off bits of flesh and, in some cases, limbs. A new addition to Left 4 Dead 2 is the Uncommon Infected unique to each campaign. By virtue of location and equipment worn pre-infection, they possess abilities that separate them from the Common Infected. For example, the Dead Center campaign introduces Infected CEDA agents in hazmat suits, making them fireproof; Dark Carnival includes clowns, whose squeaking shoes attract small hordes of Common Infected; and The Parish includes Infected private security contractors in riot gear, making them bulletproof from the front.

As in the first game, there are special Infected whose mutations grant them special abilities that make them highly dangerous, which act as bosses. The presence of such Infected nearby is hinted at by sound effects or musical cues unique to each type. The five Special Infected from the first game return in Left 4 Dead 2, some with modified behavior and skin models:

- The Boomer: an extremely bloated Infected who vomits bile. The bile attracts a horde of Common Infected on contact with Survivors and also momentarily blinds them. Upon death, they explode and can also spray bile onto nearby Survivors.
- The Hunter: an agile male Infected that can pounce on and incapacitate Survivors from great distances, tearing at them until the Survivor dies or another Survivor shoves him off/kills him.
- The Smoker: a male Infected with a long tongue that it uses to ensnare Survivors from a distance, continually choking them. Upon death, he releases a cloud of smoke that can obscure the Survivors' vision and cause them to cough, should they come in direct contact with the smoke.
- The Tank: a gigantic, extremely muscular Infected male with the strength to punch Survivors off their feet some distance, as well as toss cars and concrete slabs. Unless the Survivors work as a team, they will be quickly incapacitated or even killed by the Tank's inhuman strength.
- The Witch: a crying Infected woman who, when provoked by either damage, loud sounds, light, or proximity of survivors, will attack the provoker and any other Survivors after her provoker is dead. She can incapacitate or even kill a Survivor in one hit. Left 4 Dead 2 introduces a variant of the Witch that wanders aimlessly in the open.

Left 4 Dead 2 also introduces three new Special Infected, voiced by Dee Bradley Baker:

- The Charger: a male Infected with an enormous right arm, and can charge into the Survivors, capturing and carrying one Survivor away from the others, sending any others in his path flying to the side after a capture and stunning survivors upon hitting an obstacle in a charge. He may then pummel his captured Survivor into the ground, rendering that Survivor helpless until one of their teammates helps them by killing the charger or stunning it with frag rounds.
- The Spitter: a female Infected that spits out balls of stomach acid that splatter across an area, quickly eroding the Survivors' health as long as they remain within it. She also leaves a puddle of goo upon death. The longer the goo lingers on the ground, the more damage it deals.
- The Jockey: a male Infected that jumps onto a Survivor's back and steers them into other Infected or environmental hazards until the player is incapacitated, killed, or the Jockey is shoved off.

=== AI Director 2.0 ===
As in the first game, an artificial intelligence system called the AI Director drives gameplay by procedurally spawning enemies, health kits or defibrillators based on players' performance during any given campaign. In Left 4 Dead 2, the Director has been improved to encourage more participation by players, forcing players through difficult gauntlets to reach safety. It also has the ability to alter elements of the level, such as placement of walls, level layout, lighting, and weather conditions, making each play session unique. The Director now rewards players for taking longer or more difficult paths through each episode by providing useful equipment, such as special ammo packs or higher tier weapons.

== Synopsis ==
=== Setting ===
Like its predecessor, Left 4 Dead 2 is set in the aftermath of an outbreak on the East Coast of the United States of a disease nicknamed the "Green Flu", which rapidly transforms humans into zombie-like creatures and mutated forms that demonstrate extreme aggression towards non-Infected beings. A few humans are immune to the disease, while some of those who are Infected have no symptoms. The Civil Emergency and Defense Agency (CEDA) and the U.S. military create safe zones to attempt to evacuate as many survivors as possible. Left 4 Dead 2 introduces four new survivors: Coach, Ellis, Nick, and Rochelle, who are immune to the disease and have individual backstories that are provided through character dialogue. While the game is intended as a continuation of the original, occurring one week after the first game begins, Valve decided to create a new group of survivors due to the change in location. Like the first game, the five campaigns in Left 4 Dead 2 take place across a story arc. Set in the Deep South, the story begins in Savannah, Georgia, and ends in New Orleans, Louisiana. The four survivors have to fight their way through hordes of Infected, using safehouses along the way to rest and recuperate in order to reach extraction points.

=== Characters ===
Left 4 Dead 2 features a new cast of four human survivors: Coach (voiced by Chad L. Coleman), a stocky high school football coach with a bad knee (although this does not affect gameplay); Nick (voiced by Canadian singer Hugh Dillon), a pessimistic gambler and con artist; Rochelle (voiced by Rochelle Aytes), a low-level production assistant for a local television station that was reporting on the pandemic; and Ellis (voiced by Eric Ladin), a friendly and talkative redneck mechanic who often talks about his friend Keith and their many misadventures. In addition to the four playable characters, Left 4 Dead 2 also features two supporting characters in the form of Whitaker (voiced by Dayton Callie), a gun store owner, and Virgil (voiced by Randall Newsome), a Cajun boat captain who appears (voice only) in the game's final three campaigns. Two soldiers heard in the final map of The Parish, voiced by Bob Gunter and Bill Huggins, round out the NPC cast.

=== Plot ===
The amusement park in the Dark Carnival campaign

The Sacrifice takes place before the main events of Left 4 Dead 2 and after the events of comic book of the same name. At the end of the first game, the original survivors—Bill, Francis, Louis, and Zoey—arrive at the portside town of Rayford in Georgia in order to search for a boat that can take them to the Florida Keys. After finding an adequate sailboat, the survivors have to manually start up generators in order to lift a bridge for their boat to pass through. One survivor (canonically Bill) sacrifices themself in order to kick-start a generator once it gives out, so that the others may reach safety. This is the end of Bill's story in the Left 4 Dead video game series.

Left 4 Dead 2 opens in Dead Center (set in Savannah, Georgia), where the four survivors find themselves abandoned on a hotel roof by rescue helicopters. They decide to head for the local mall, where a second CEDA evacuation point is located. After a brief encounter with a gun store owner, Whitaker, the survivors discover that the mall is overrun, with all CEDA agents having become either dead or Infected as well. Ellis helps the group use a stock car to break out of the mall and travel towards New Orleans, rumored to be the last standing city in America.

The Passing takes place between Dead Center and Dark Carnival, and after the events of The Sacrifice campaign. The survivors arrive at the bridge in Rayford, where they meet Francis, Louis, and Zoey. As they need to cross the bridge to proceed, the Survivors need to find another way across to refill the generator with gas. After fighting their way through a wedding reception (complete with a Witch bride), the streets, and a historic under-the-river tour, they meet up again with the original survivors, who help by covering for the group while they fill the generator and lowering the bridge once it's full.

At the start of the Dark Carnival campaign, the four survivors find the highway ahead completely blocked by ditched vehicles, and are forced to travel on foot through an abandoned (but still operating) amusement park. After navigating their way to the park stadium, Coach devises a plan to use a large-scale light show on the concert stage, which had been abandoned by a rock band called The Midnight Riders, in order to signal a helicopter pilot for rescue. After being rescued, they later discover that their pilot is Infected. When the pilot starts attacking them, Nick is forced to kill him (echoing a similar situation in Left 4 Dead), causing the chopper to crash into a bayou, which acts as the setting for Swamp Fever. Working their way through the swamps, the group comes across a crashed airplane, dead military paratroopers, and isolated swamp villages which had held out against the Infected but were eventually overrun. After spending the morning fighting through the swamp, the group arrives at a plantation mansion and make radio contact with Virgil, a Cajun boat captain who can assist them; however, his boat begins to run low on diesel fuel on the way to New Orleans.

As a tumultuous hurricane approaches (the titular Hard Rain of the subsequent campaign), the survivors go ashore at Ducatel in Mississippi, after which they make their way through an abandoned (and Witch-infested) sugarcane mill to a gas station to get diesel fuel, and return to signal Virgil using the neon sign of a burger chain restaurant. In the final campaign, The Parish, Virgil drops the group off at New Orleans, where the military appears to be evacuating civilians across a bridge. On the way there, the four discover the city overrun with Infected and that the military is actually leaving the city as well as conducting bombing runs on roads and bridges presumably in order to stop the infected from migrating. The group manages to reach the bridge, where they make contact with the military. Judging from their dialogue, the military pilots suspect the survivors to be "carriers", similar to the original survivors of Left 4 Dead. After securing their rescue helicopter, the survivors lower and cross the bridge, escaping on the helicopter just as the bridge is destroyed. While the survivors' fate is left unclear after this point, the game's writer Chet Faliszek stated in a 2009 interview that the military took survivors on cruise ships to the Caribbean in an attempt to escape the infection.

== Development ==
Development for Left 4 Dead 2 started shortly after the release of the first game—following a short break—building on ideas from the development team to make the next game "bigger and better". According to Chet Faliszek in a 2023 interview, Left 4 Dead had been developed quickly to release as soon as possible that it left the game in a bad state that no one at Valve wanted to work on correcting the issues to improve the game. Instead of trying to fix features and include new features like mod support, the team opted to completely rebuild the game as a new title, properly addressing strong development steps to avoid the miscues from creating the first game. The game was given the code name "Carnation" by Microsoft to prevent revealing its details before its official announcement.

Faliszek stated that Left 4 Dead 2's story would explore more of the world of the game, and that Valve had created a full story for the cause and effects of the infection pandemic, including terms that they have used for the AI Director. Each campaign was purposely designed with a different feel; however, all five campaigns were mapped out at the same time by the entire team to provide the narrative flow and ensure the uniqueness of each campaign. The team used a Left 4 Dead dictionary developed to describe level design and flow within the game to provide a common language for developing the levels.

Left 4 Dead 2 contains about 7,800 unique lines of dialogue, a 40% increase over Left 4 Dead. The writers designed the characters and selected appropriate voice actors who had natural accents for their lines and allowed the actors freedom to help authenticate the roles. They would attend recording sessions for the voice actors and allow them to ad-lib their lines for their characters, often getting new ideas for character dialogue to be recorded later, particularly in the case of Ellis (voiced by Eric Ladin) and Nick (Hugh Dillon). Randall Newsome, the voice of the boat captain Virgil, was a local actor from Louisiana who naturally spoke Cajun and helped to embellish the role better than the writers could. Faliszek wanted to include a "no-nonsense" woman from a Department of Motor Vehicles, but this character did not make the cut. The developers solicited several bands to include them in the game: Depeche Mode responded eagerly, and allowed Valve to use its music and other imagery in the game, such as on Rochelle's T-shirt.

In introducing the new Infected, the development team had to consider how the new abilities would mesh with the existing Infected and any changes they had made to them. One discarded idea for a new Infected included the "Leaker"; the creature, when having taken damage, would shoot out spouts of goo at the survivors, and then would be able to self-detonate like the Boomer. However, this sacrificial act would have given survivors time to escape, and the idea was dropped, though features of the Leaker were built into the Spitter.

In development, the programmers wanted to find a way to provide more variation and visual effects for the players, although they were already strained by memory limitations on the Xbox 360 for Left 4 Dead. One key development factor was recognizing a way to create greater variation in the appearance of the common Infected through a number of modeling and rendering tasks. Simple changes of the underlying geometry of the model, either the head or the body, with the resulting effects on the texture mapping was one means to create apparent variation. Another means was created by using different head textures along with various blood and dirt maps, and similarly different wounds applied to the body texture. A final means to alter the tone of both the skin and the clothing worn by the Infected. As a result, a single Infected model could have up to 24,000 variations within the game. This allowed Valve to effectively only keep two to six common Infected core models in memory for each level, leaving only the unique Infected for each campaign and the special Infected as their own unique models. As a result, the memory use for the Infected dropped by 50%. Valve's programmers also sought how to better represent damage the players did to the Infected by showing inflicted wounds in the appropriate location and in a manner based on the weapon used, allowing for the inclusion of more resilient Infected creatures in advanced game modes. They had simulated this in Left 4 Dead by having five possible character models that would result from a fatal attack but felt this could be advanced further. Already limited by memory concerns on the Xbox 360 that prevented further variations on the core Infected models, the team devised a system of using textures with transparencies combined with ellipsoid culling from any Infected character model to simulate the wounds, with several graphical process simplifications to avoid taxing the rendering system. This allowed the team to simulate up to two such wounds on each Infected using only 13% of the memory resources of the based system in Left 4 Dead.

Another visual aspect that the Valve team explored was the rendering of water, particularly in the "Swamp Fever" campaign, which takes place mostly in a large swamp area. Valve found early play-testers would become confused with the large, tree-covered map, but by adding hints of water movement in the direction they were to go, there was a significant reduction in players becoming lost on the map. The water maps were created by using the 3D animation tool Houdini against its landscape maps to create realistic water flow patterns as surface maps. These surface maps were then applied in a "flowing" manner instead of the scrolling manner used in previous games. These water effects were further expanded upon for Valve's next game, Portal 2.

Doug Lombardi, vice-president of marketing for Valve, noted that the SDK released for Left 4 Dead would also be compatible with Left 4 Dead 2.

== Marketing ==
Left 4 Dead 2 was formally announced during Microsoft's press conference at the E3 event in June 2009 with a short teaser. A longer trailer for the game had appeared in late October 2009, attributed as a leak since it had not been formally released by Valve. According to Faliszek in 2026, the ESRB, which had previously engaged with Valve over the content of Left 4 Dead, had blocked Valve from releasing the video for marketing claiming it was too violent. Instead, Valve developers purposely arranged the trailer video to be leaked, knowing it would spread widely via the Internet.

PC and Xbox 360 players who pre-ordered Left 4 Dead 2 through participating retailers gained early access to the game's demo, which was released on October 27, 2009, for Xbox Live and October 28, 2009, for PC players, and an exclusive baseball bat melee weapon to be used in game. Pre-ordering the PC version of the game through the Steam network also unlocks Bill's beret from Left 4 Dead for use in the PC version of Team Fortress 2. Also, when a person buys the game and starts up Team Fortress 2, they will get a frying pan as a melee weapon and Ellis' hat as an in-game hat. The demo became available for all PC and Xbox Live Gold users on November 3, 2009, with Xbox Live Silver users gaining access on November 10, 2009. The demo features the first two maps in "The Parish" campaign.

On October 5, 2009, Valve announced that Left 4 Dead 2 would be promoted by a $25 million advertising campaign, exceeding the $10 million that supported Left 4 Dead. The campaign includes television advertisements during sporting events, on billboards and magazines; and more aggressive advertising for Europe.

== Release ==
Left 4 Dead 2 was released on Windows on November 16, 2009. The Xbox 360 version as well as retail copies were published by Electronic Arts. Retail copies were made available some days after, depending on the country.

On December 25, 2013, Valve made the game for free for a limited time for new players. The Christmas update also included a special achievement called "Ghost of Christmas Present," awarded to veteran players who helped the free holiday players survive in the game's campaign mode.

=== Mac and Linux versions ===
In March 2010, Valve announced that it would be bringing the Steam content platform to Mac OS X computers, as well as providing native versions of existing Valve games, including Left 4 Dead and Left 4 Dead 2. Both games support cross-platform play, allowing Mac players to play alongside PC players on the same servers. They also support Steam Play and Steam Cloud, allowing a player who has purchased the game on one platform to download and play it on the other platform for free, with their save data intact. The OS X client was released on October 5, 2010.

With the introduction of a Linux client for Steam, Valve announced that Left 4 Dead 2 would be ported to Linux. The port was released on May 3, 2013.

=== Arcade version ===
A Japanese arcade cabinet version of L4D2 titled Left 4 Dead: Survivors (Left 4 Dead: 生存者たち, (Seizonshatachi)) was developed and released under license by Taito in December 2014. The arcade version featured a unique mouse-and-handset control scheme, exclusive skins and weapons, online and local connected play, and unique limited online events (with the online service ending in 2017). The plot and gameplay remains largely unchanged from L4D2, streamlined and modified for a time-limited arcade environment. The game also features four exclusive survivors which replace the original survivors: Haruka Hirose (広瀬遥, Hirose Haruka; voiced by Ayane Sakura), a Japanese schoolgirl visiting America on a school trip; Yuusuke Kudou (工藤佑介, Kudō Yūsuke; voiced by Ryuichi Kijima), a Japanese college student on vacation; Sara Kirishima (霧島沙良, Kirishima Sara; voiced by Miyuki Sawashiro), a half-Japanese half-American tour guide; and Blake Jordan (ブレイク・ジョーダン, Bureiku Jōdan; voiced by Hidenori Takahashi), an American bartender and army veteran.

== Additional content ==
=== Downloadable content ===
On December 14, 2009, Valve announced the first DLC installment for Left 4 Dead 2, The Passing. Though initially planned to be released sometime in March 2010, "The Passing" was released on April 22, 2010. The content costs 560 Microsoft Points ($6.99) for the Xbox 360 and is free for PC and Mac users. The campaign, taking place between the "Dead Center" and "Dark Carnival" campaigns, features the cast of Left 4 Dead 2 meeting with three of the survivors from the original Left 4 Dead. The new group learns that the fourth original survivor, Bill, sacrificed himself to allow his comrades to continue on safely. The title "The Passing" can be interpreted in several ways; to Bill's passing, the brief passing encounter between the two groups, and of the first group of survivors "passing the torch" to the next. "The Passing" contains references to other zombie-themed works, including the games Dead Rising (2006) and Plants vs. Zombies (2009), and the film 28 Days Later (2002). The add-on also features two new weapons, an M60 machine gun which becomes unusable once depleted of ammo, and a golf club for melee.

A prequel to The Passing, titled The Sacrifice, was released on October 5, 2010, as an add-on for both Left 4 Dead and Left 4 Dead 2. This prequel ties up the story of the original game, showing the events leading to the meeting of the two groups of survivors in "The Passing" from the point of the Left 4 Dead characters. However, players can choose which character will sacrifice themselves for the others to safely continue on and not just the canonical choice of Bill. Valve also provided the full "No Mercy" campaign from Left 4 Dead as a Left 4 Dead 2 campaign, which is playable with the original Survivors from Left 4 Dead. Though the maps are nearly identical to their appearance in Left 4 Dead, No Mercy in Left 4 Dead 2 contains all of the enhancements of the sequel, including the new Special Infected, Uncommon Infected, melee weapons, additional guns, and the ability to use the new game modes, including Mutations and Scavenge mode.

An additional community-created downloadable content package, called Cold Stream, was released July 24, 2012 for Xbox 360 and PC. Valve announced testing had begun on the Xbox 360, as well as for all the original Left 4 Dead maps via the L4D Blog. The content was in public beta, available to players for testing and data collection on any issues, with a complete release date on 24 July. On July 24 it was announced that Valve did not send the downloadable content package to Microsoft. On August 1, 2012, it was announced that Cold Stream would be made available for Xbox 360 on August 3, at the price point of 560 MSP ($6.99).

A community-made scenario, "The Last Stand", was released on September 24, 2020, with Valve's blessing as an official update to the game. The update includes a new campaign of the same name, over twenty new survival maps and several miscellaneous changes to the game. The leads on the community project had worked on levels and had pitched the idea to Valve around 2019, but at that time, the studio was in the final stages of finishing Half-Life: Alyx, but gave the team permission to continue what it was doing, including providing a map of a lighthouse setting (the origin of "The Last Stand" name) that was used in the original Left 4 Dead as a Survival-mode exclusive map. When Alyx was mostly complete, members from Valve took time to review the state of the project, and were impressed with its state. Valve subsequently provided minimal technical support in terms of Source engine support, leaving the community team to handle the rest.

=== Mutations ===
Mutations are modifications on Left 4 Dead 2's game modes, which have been offered every week after The Passing's release; these game modes alter the conditions of play. All Mutations are now available through an update, making them selectable in the PC version. At this time Valve added the "Realism Versus" mutation to the game as a permanent game mode. All Mutations became available for Xbox 360 users with the release of Cold Stream.

=== Community mods ===
Similar to Left 4 Dead and other Source Engine-based games, a number of players have constructed new maps, campaigns, and other variations for Left 4 Dead 2, supported by Valve through their software development kit for the game. With the kit, players have found ways to include the original Left 4 Dead campaigns into Left 4 Dead 2. Players have also found ways to increase the number of survivors up to 16, duplicating the graphics for the existing survivor characters as needed. In August 2010, Valve announced that it will promote selected community generated maps, one every two weeks, both by blog posts on their official site, and by offering the map on a number of their dedicated servers. Valve updated the game in January 2013 to include support for Steam Workshop, allowing users to create and share new scenarios, maps, characters and weapons, and to create Mutation-like changes that can be applied to existing maps. A further patch in February 2013 introduced a new scripting system, Expanded Mutation System, that gives programmers more control and options to create new Mutations that can be played across any map or to customize behavior in specific campaigns; one such user-created Mutation creates an experience similar to the Zombie mode in Call of Duty: Black Ops II, allowing players to buy weapons and barricades to fight off waves of zombies.

== Related media ==
A proposed content package and tie-in for the 2012 horror film The Cabin in the Woods was in the works, but the project dissolved after the film's original production company, MGM, filed for bankruptcy. The film's director, Drew Goddard, commented on what the downloadable content would have included, stating: "The game was gonna be amazing. You were gonna be able to play in both the upstairs Cabin in the Woods world and the downstairs 'facility' world with all the monsters. Believe me, I HATE all video games based on movies, they always suck, but porting Cabin into Left For Dead felt like the right fit. It pains me that it didn't happen." Valve did allow the filmmakers to include the Left 4 Dead 2 bosses as monsters to populate some of the scenes in the film despite the failed project.

On April 4, 2013, a Resident Evil 6 crossover DLC was released for the PC version. It adds the main characters and two monsters from Left 4 Dead 2 to the PC-exclusive The Mercenaries: No Mercy mode in Resident Evil 6. Also three monsters from Resident Evil 6 are added as replacement skins to existing monsters on the PC version of Left 4 Dead 2.

On August 20, 2015, an update for the game Zombie Army Trilogy was released, which imported the eight survivors from both Left 4 Dead games into ZAT. In 2021, the characters were added to the games sequel Zombie Army 4: Dead War.

== Reception ==
=== Critical reception ===
Reception

Aggregate score
Aggregator	Score
Metacritic	89/100

Review scores
Publication	Score
Destructoid	9.5/10
Edge	9/10
Eurogamer	9/10
Game Informer	9.5/10
GameRevolution	B
GameSpot	9/10
GameSpy	4.5/5 stars
GamesRadar+	4.5/5 stars
IGN	9/10
VideoGamer.com	9/10

Left 4 Dead 2 received "generally favorable reviews" across both platforms according to review aggregator website Metacritic. Game journalists praised the changes made with the new melee weapons and firearms, the new strategies introduced through the new special Infected, and the details of the southern locale and individual campaigns compared with the campaigns of the first game. Ars Technica praised the game's replayability and the attention put in every detail. Libération also praised the game, commenting that Valve was one of the last game studios making games geared toward hardcore PC gamers. IGN considered that the game improved on the first in every way, and that anyone who liked the concepts introduced by the first game should buy the second. Eurogamer also praised the game, and considered that it was "overflowing with personality". Left 4 Dead 2 received the Best Xbox 360 Game award at the 2009 Spike Video Game Awards. During the 13th Annual Interactive Achievement Awards (now known as the D.I.C.E. Awards), the game has been nominated for "Outstanding Achievement in Gameplay Engineering", "Outstanding Achievement in Online Gameplay", and "Action Game of the Year". In 2016, it won the "Better With Friends" Award in the first-ever Steam Awards.

=== Technical issues ===
The Xbox 360 version of the game was noted at launch for having serious issues with lag and slowdown in online game modes, the majority coming from using the game's dedicated servers. According to Valve, these problems were due to an unexpectedly huge number of players online on Xbox LIVE. It was shortly fixed after release by a server infrastructure change and adding new dedicated servers.

=== Sales ===
Pre-release sales estimates for Left 4 Dead 2 were positive. As of July 2009, Left 4 Dead 2 ranked first in purchase intent out of all upcoming games, with 9 out of 10 polled stating that they would buy the game. According to Lombardi, pre-orders for the sequel within the month following the announcement were double those for Left 4 Dead at the same time relative to release date. In a press release on October 5, 2009, Valve announced that, based on the strength of pre-orders, they expect Left 4 Dead 2 to be the fastest selling product in the company's history, with the game's pre-release sales averaging 300% greater than Left 4 Dead. In an interview in November 2009, Chet Faliszek claimed the number of pre-sales of Left 4 Dead 2 were four times that of the original game.

On December 1, 2009, Valve reported that more than two million retailed copies of Left 4 Dead 2 were sold in two weeks, which represents "more than double" the sales of the original game's two week debut. According to the NPD Group, the Xbox 360 version was the fifth best-selling retail title for consoles in November 2009, with over 744,000 copies sold.

In February 2010, Electronic Arts, Left 4 Dead 2 retail distributor, revealed that the game had sold 2.9 million on retail so far while Forbes wrote that more than 4 million copies were sold at stores in 2009.

Over two weeks in July 2010, approximately 12,000 owners of Call of Duty: Modern Warfare 2 were mistakenly banned by Valve's-Anti-Cheat system. Those affected received a free copy of the game, which could be sent as a gift if the user already owned a copy.

On May 10, 2011, Doug Lombardi mentioned that each of the Left 4 Dead games had sold three million copies on the Xbox 360. In September 2012, Faliszek, in an interview with VG247, said that the series had sold over 12 million in total. The game was offered free for a day on Steam during Christmas 2013.

=== Competitive play ===
On PC, the original competitive modification named "Confogl", was created by community member ProdigySim. It is now a playable mutation included in the game. Confogl is a set of rules for competitive Left 4 Dead 2 Versus mode which standardizes certain elements and changes the distribution of items and weapons. For example, it removes medkits in favor of pills and tier 2 weapons (i.e the AK, the M16, and both auto-shotguns). It also features a unique bonus system that takes into account both distance and health. It tips the scales toward the Infected. Tournaments have been held utilizing the Confogl modification, such as the CEVO tournament.

== Controversies ==
Left 4 Dead 2 has been a central issue in a number of critical discussions regarding its timing and its graphic and mature content. John Walker of UK-based gaming website Rock Paper Shotgun has theorized that this is due to higher expectations for Valve, given the perception of its status as an industry leader.

=== Boycott ===
The weekend following the game's announcement at the 2009 E3 Convention, some Left 4 Dead players called for a boycott of Left 4 Dead 2 and formed the Steam community group called "L4D2 Boycott (NO-L4D2)" which grew to over 10,000 members by the end of that weekend, and reached more than 37,000 about a month later. First reported on by Kotaku, in addition to a lack of further Left 4 Dead content, the group was concerned with the characters, visuals, and music shown in the E3 demonstration video, feeling these were inappropriate to the first game's aesthetics, and that the release of the sequel so soon after the first game would fracture the community.

In response to these complaints, Valve marketer Doug Lombardi stated that the announcement of Left 4 Dead 2 at E3 should not be taken to indicate that Valve would no longer support the first game. He asked the community to "trust them a little bit," and told them that while their team was eager to get new material to players of Left 4 Dead, they determined that a sequel would be the best option for several reasons: the demand for new campaigns, enemies and weapons could not be met as a simple DLC; both Faliszek and project lead Tom Leonard found that too much of the content relied on each other, making it very difficult to release incremental patches in the same style as Team Fortress 2 (2007); the development team liked the idea of rolling up the content into a sequel to be released a year after Left 4 Dead's release. Faliszek stated that Newell was skeptical of the idea when the team brought the sequel forward, but still allowed the project to go through.

In September 2009, Valve flew two of the boycott group's most prominent members to Valve, in order to playtest Left 4 Dead 2; the two felt that the sequel was well done. This event, through a series of correspondences made in jest, shortly led to Valve's Gabe Newell and designer Erik Johnson flying to Australia to visit "Joe W-A", a Left 4 Dead modder. Newell jokingly reported that Valve was "boycotting" Joe's new mod for the game when Joe asked when he would be flown to Valve in the same manner as the Left 4 Dead 2 boycotters, but whimsically offered that if Joe was to pay to fly him to the country, he would take a look at it. Joe was able to raise the required funds, US$3,000, through donations through his website, though ultimately Newell paid for the trip himself, with Joe's collected donations going to the Child's Play charity.

On October 14, 2009, the initiators of the boycott group announced that they had ended their boycott and were shutting down the 40,000-plus group because Valve was retaining their promise of additional content and fixes for Left 4 Dead, such as the recent release of the "Crash Course" campaign. These gamers also believed that the group itself, losing its purpose, was now being used just to bad-mouth Valve, their staff and other players. In a video interview posted on October 29, 2009, Gabe Newell said, "for people who joined the Boycott Group on Steam ... they're actually pre-ordering the product at a higher rate than Left 4 Dead 1 owners who weren't in the boycott".

=== Cover art ===
The UK version of the box art shows the back of the hand facing away to avoid offense.

Valve was forced to alter its original cover art for the game by the ESRB; the original image depicted the series' hand with its little finger, ring finger and the thumb torn off, which would thus have the index finger and middle finger remaining. It was deemed too explicit, and to appease the ESRB, Valve changed the image so that the fingers were merely bent back instead, but the company was still able to include the torn-off thumb in all regions except for Japan and Germany, where it had to be censored.

The cover was further changed for release in the United Kingdom, as the two-finger sign with the back of the hand faced toward the viewer is considered an insult; the UK cover features the hand facing the opposite direction to avoid this, making it instead the more optimistic gesture for "victory".

=== Racism accusations ===
Willie Jefferson of the Houston Chronicle, after seeing initial promotional material for the game, considered that several of the Infected "appear to be African-Americans" implying a racist approach to the game, and also noted that "setting the game in a city that was a scene of dead, bloated bodies floating by" some years after the impact of Hurricane Katrina was "a bad call". Faliszek, commenting on Jefferson's claims, considered the supposition to be "utter insanity", and commented that the Infected are a mix of all races, and that the game's version of New Orleans is "not a brick-for-brick representation" of the city and were not trying to make any statement about it with the game. A writer for Kotaku considered that Jefferson "seems to me to be picking a fight where none exists." Others noted that the appearance of African-American Infected simply reflected the racial diversity of New Orleans.

=== Australian ban and unbanning ===
Left 4 Dead 2 was refused classification in Australia by the Office of Film and Literature Classification (OFLC). It failed to gain an MA15+ rating, the highest possible rating for video games in Australia at the time of release. This prevented the sale of the original game within the country. In its report, the OFLC cited the reason for refusing classification as "realistic, frenetic and unrelenting violence". However, a small number of members of the OFLC board believed the game could merit the MA15+ rating which was used to publish the first Left 4 Dead. It was expected that changes could be made to the game to allow the game to be classified as MA15+ and thus sold in Australia. Both Lombardi and Newell were "surprised" by the classification refusal. Valve appealed the OFLC's decision about a week after being notified of the ruling, comparing the sequel to its predecessor, which had been classified as MA15+, and the mature ratings the sequel had received from similar rating organizations around the world. However, as the appeal process, expected to end on October 22, was close to the planned release date, Valve submitted a modified version of the game for classification addressing the concerns the OFLC has stated. This version, which no longer contained images of "decapitation, dismemberment, wound detail or piles of dead bodies", was classified as MA15+ by the OFLC, thus allowing for the game's release in Australia, though Valve and Electronic Arts still hoped to have their preferred, unmodified version classified by the OFLC for release. The appeal of the decision to deny classification to the unedited version of the game was conducted by the independent Classification Review Board, and resulted in the previous ruling to deny classification being sustained. The Classification Review Board cited "insufficient delineation between the depiction of zombie characters and the human figures" as one of the key factors in its classification refusal.

Left 4 Dead 2's classification refusal, as well as for other games from this era, such as Fallout 3 (since rerated MA15+ having the same version as other countries) and Aliens vs. Predator (since appealed and rerated MA15+ uncut), reignited debate over the prohibition of sale and exhibition of video games for mature audiences. In mid-December 2009, the Australian government sought public opinion on the adult classification rating for video games, despite statements by South Australian Attorney General Michael Atkinson believing the issue to only affect a minority of the country's citizens. Following Atkinson's decision to leave the Attorneys General to be replaced by John Rau, who was reportedly in favour of an R18+ rating, Valve revealed that, should the bill be passed, they planned to release an uncensored version of Left 4 Dead 2 for PC in Australia. The Australian Federal Parliament passed legislation allowing an R18+ classification for video games on January 1, 2013, and Valve stated they would explore legal options of resubmitting the uncensored version of Left 4 Dead 2 following this change.

On August 29, 2014, the uncensored version was reclassified R18+, effectively unbanning the game, five years after the original release, with Valve adding in the availability to switch to the uncensored version as downloadable content for users who had purchased the game before the ratings change.

=== German ban and unbanning ===
In order to achieve the highest possible rating given by Germany's Unterhaltungssoftware Selbstkontrolle (Freigegeben ab 18 Jahren gemäß § 14 JuSchG, meaning "Restricted for those below the age of 18"), Valve had to heavily censor the game's violent content similar to the Australian version. However, the international (and thus uncensored) version was indexed by the Federal Department for Media Harmful to Young Persons on December 1, 2009, in order to prevent sellers from advertising or selling it to minors. On February 15, 2010, the Amtsgericht Tiergarten confiscated all European PC versions for violation of § 131 StGB (representation of violence), meaning they may not be sold; however, it is still legal to import (with the risk that the game is confiscated by customs) and own the game. The court said that the game trivializes violence due to its high killing rate and explicit graphical representation of mutilation. They also sensed a strong cynical attitude behind the game's concept.

On January 29, 2021, the uncensored version was released for Germany after a re-evaluation from German authorities and was reclassified to 18. Users in Germany who had purchased the game can switch to the uncensored version as downloadable content, similarly to Australian consumers.
