= Pixel Force: Left 4 Dead =

2010 video game

- Title screen
- Developer: Eric Ruth Games
- Publisher: Eric Ruth Games
- Designer: Eric Ruth
- Engine: Game Maker 7
- Platform: Microsoft Windows
- Release: January 4, 2010
- Genre: Top-down shooter
- Modes: Single-player, multiplayer

Pixel Force: Left 4 Dead is a fan-made, 8-bit-styled demake of Valve's 2008 first-person shooter game Left 4 Dead. It was developed by indie developer Eric Ruth Games and released as freeware on January 4, 2010. It was designer Eric Ruth's first attempt at an 8-bit demake, with the most difficult part for Ruth being the music composition due to Left 4 Dead's soundtrack depth and the limited audio that Ruth could work with. Pixel Force: Left 4 Dead allows players to control one or more of four survivors. It is an overhead shooter, similar to NES games Ikari Warriors and Fester's Quest. It was the first of the Pixel Force series, followed by Pixel Force: Halo and Pixel Force: DJ Hero.

The trailer was the target of mostly positive reception, though the post-release reception was more positive, with Left 4 Dead's publisher Valve calling the idea behind it "hilarious". Ruth was praised for his ability to demake Left 4 Dead into a Nintendo Entertainment System-style video game.

== Gameplay ==
Gameplay of Pixel Force: Left 4 Dead

Pixel Force: Left 4 Dead is based on the Valve game Left 4 Dead, which is a first-person shooter, while the Pixel Force demake is a top-down shooter. The game adapts all four launch campaigns as well as featuring the same cast of characters: Zoey, Bill, Louis, and Francis. These maps have five areas each. In addition to standard zombies, the game features zombies called the Special Infected. It features multiplayer for up to two players and two difficulty modes. Players are tasked with making it through these levels while killing infected that stand in their way. Along the way, they can upgrade their weaponry to make the task easier.

== Development ==
Pixel Force: Left 4 Dead was developed by independent video game designer Eric Ruth under Eric Ruth Games. It was his first attempt at creating an 8-bit-styled remake of a previously existing title, regarding Left 4 Dead as a game he cherished. The idea of making an 8-bit remake of Left 4 Dead originally took form when he suggested to his friend the idea of remaking Left 4 Dead as a Nintendo Entertainment System (NES) game to his friend, who liked the idea. Ruth was the sole developer of the game, while friends provided quality assurance. While developing another game called Mean Kathleen and the Great Quack Machine, he began working on sprites for the four survivors and special infected from Left 4 Dead for fun. They turned out well enough that he decided to expand the sprites. The composition of the music was the most difficult part of the game's development for him, due to Valve's Left 4 Dead's composition, citing "heavy string sections, brass, digital choruses, and more". This made it difficult to adapt it to only four channels of sound, two square waves, a triangle wave, and a noise channel in order to reproduce the NES' sound limitations. Despite Left 4 Dead's four-player support, the Pixel Force version only has two-player support for technical reasons. Ruth also had to cut the Survivor and Versus modes from the original Left 4 Dead, along with some of the weapons. As of November 15, 2009, Ruth had completed one map — No Mercy — as well as most of the core game mechanics. The game was released on January 4, 2010, for Microsoft Windows.

Pixel Force: Left 4 Dead started a series of fan-made retro game demakes of newer games under the Pixel Force label, followed by Pixel Force: DJ Hero and Pixel Force: Halo. A Pixel Force demake of the video game Psychonauts was considered.

== Reception ==
Before its release, Pixel Force: Left 4 Dead received mostly positive reception for its trailers. In response to the first trailer, Kotaku writer Owen Good felt that the infected were too docile and the game seemed too easy. GameSpy writer Tyler Barber thought it was cute, though felt that a fast-paced action game like Robotron 2084 would fit Left 4 Dead better. However, he still intended to download it. Retronauts' Bob Mackey called it "impressive", noting that while the first trailer was disappointing, the more recent one showed its ambition. 1Up.com writer Chris Pereira also found it impressive due to it being made by only one person. Rock Paper Shotgun writer Alec Meer thought the game looked "lovely".

Upon release, the game was met with positive reception, with Valve describing the idea behind the game as "hilarious". Destructoid writer Jonathan Holmes called it "pretty fun", comparing its play style to NES games Fester's Quest and Ikari Warriors. Fellow Destructoid writer Jordan Devore called it a "cool little project", though he wished zombies moved faster. The Escapist writer John Funk noted it as a good choice for fans of both zombie and retro games. Eurogamer writer Tom Bramwell felt it was worth it for its "cutesy" take on Left 4 Dead. GameSpot writer Marco Martinez did an indie spotlight on the game, calling it "fun", while The Escapist writer Marshall Lemon included it in their list of demake recommendations, praising it for how "faithful" it is. GamePro writer Dave Rudden, while not having played it, hoped that it would inspire more demakes.
