= Witch (Left 4 Dead) =

Left 4 Dead enemy

- Witch in Left 4 Dead 2
- First appearance: Left 4 Dead (2008)

The Witch is a fictional monster in the Left 4 Dead series of video games. She is a particularly powerful zombie in the game, but unless agitated, will not attack the players. She is usually seen crying while sitting, and if approached or bothered by light or sounds, will become more agitated. She chases the agitating character to kill them, fleeing once she succeeds. She also appears in Left 4 Dead 2, gaining a new form during the day that is able to wander around with her eyes covered. When a Witch is present, her crying and a music theme consisting of wailing moans and piano notes can be heard. Left 4 Dead writer Chet Faliszek stated that this was a simpler way to convey "scary, threatening, and cool" despite discouraging players from approaching her.

The Witch has received generally positive reception, praised for how frightening she is. Her theme has also been the subject of discussion by critics, who analyzed both the composition of the song and how players are impacted by it.

== Concept and appearances ==
The Witch is a type of zombie in the Left 4 Dead games, which center around four survivors attempting to reach safety while fighting zombies. She is thin with a "deadly" appearance, gold/brown eyes, and long, bloody claws. Unlike most zombies in the game, the Witch is particularly powerful, though is usually passive, only attacking the player or their allies if disturbed. They appear occasionally throughout a play session, and can be identified by the sound of crying and a musical sting associated with her. This sting involves multiple elements, including "wailing moans and haunting, operatic screams" and "atrocious piano notes." When approached, she becomes agitated, and can also become agitated if light is shined on them or a loud sound is made near her. They will eventually attempt to attack the player if agitated enough. The Witch will run after the player that disturbed them; once her target is dead, she will attempt to flee. When asked of the story of the Witch, Left 4 Dead writer Chet Faliszek responded that she is "singular with her obsession."

In Left 4 Dead 2, during the night, she sits and cries; during the day, a new variation is added that walks around, head held in her hands, growing agitated if anyone is near her. A large number of Witches can also be found at a sugar mill. In the chapter "The Passing," a regular Witch wearing a wedding dress can be found crying at her wedding. A new challenge was added to Left 4 Dead 2 that allows Witches to permanently kill a player's character during a game.

The Witch makes an appearance in the Resident Evil 6/Left 4 Dead crossover on PC.

== Development and casting ==
Left 4 Dead writer Chet Faliszek stated that they aimed to design the Witch to be "scary, threatening, and cool" despite the player being discouraged from looking at her, which he stated was an odd process. To Faliszek, the audio was an important part of achieving these elements, stating that just hearing her voice does more to build her up than seeing her does. Originally, she was designed to attack the entire group upon being startled, but this was changed due to it being too common for a Witch to kill all the players. She was also capable of using an attack that damages people around the target. She is voiced by a combination of actress Ellen McLain and voice recordings from a sound pack. McLain did her voice work over a short period of time. Her voice work consisted largely of gasps, groans, and crying. She was also told to do death screams for the role.

== Reception ==
The Witch has received generally positive reception, identified by critics and a reader poll by The Telegraph ranked Witch as one of the scariest video game monsters. GamesRadar+ writer Alyssa Mercante recounted how she did not take anything in Left 4 Dead as a serious threat. This caused her to be attacked by the Witch, scaring her enough that she stated that the sound of a Witch sends chills down her spine, and the presence of the Witch often causes her to make mistakes due to being nervous. Rock Paper Shotgun writer John Walker considered the Witch one of the most "frightening and fascinating" video games enemies, feeling that the signs of a Witch's presence changes the mood completely. He discussed how dealing with the Witch often can easily go poorly with even a small mistake, and expressed awe over the idea of an enemy that discourages interacting with it from a game design perspective. He also felt that her design elements helped make her feel more threatening, particularly he merely sitting there and crying. He stated that crying was a horror trope, a signal to come help someone in danger; meanwhile, he stated that the Witch taught players to act in opposition to the biological urge to take care of someone crying. He also discussed her song, which he felt was slight enough that it made players paranoid whether it's being played at all.

PC Gamer writer Jody Macgregor considered the Witch a great moment in video games, stating her believe that the Witch's theme would be the theme players would most likely memorize first. She felt that the way the melody changes with the Witch's disposition conveyed a sense of escalation, and helped encourage careful play around the Witch. Macgregor stated that not startling the Witch can be more difficult than it seems, and that she never gets used to the frightening nature of the Witch's attack. In terms of gameplay, she believed that the Witch had the opposite goal of other Special Infected; where they were designed to split the party, the Witch was designed to unite them in the task of circumnavigating the Witch.

Writer Ben Richardson believed she was one of the most unique aspects of Left 4 Dead, discussing how much dread he had leading up to the appearance of the Witch and how much it fulfilled his expectations when she did appear. He attributed this to both having to worry about angering such a powerful enemy, as well as having to potentially miss key details, such as an incoming horde, in the process of avoiding looking at the Witch. Author Michael Kamp discussed the Witch's theme, stating that it exists to tell players that they need to change their behavior temporarily. He stated that the song goes through three stages, with an anticipatory signal in the first two stages. They also believed that it could be used to demonstrate how different kinds of players react differently to the Witch's theme, citing a beginner, intermediate, and expert player. The reaction, respectively, included fear, being proactive with finding the source of the music, and fulfilling the action they have learned to do in response to the music. They believed this reflected the player progressively being less bothered by the "eerie qualities" of the music.
