= Left 4 Dead =

2008 video game

- Developer: Valve South (Note: Certain Affinity assisted Valve South with the Xbox 360 version of the game.)
- Publishers: Valve; Electronic Arts (Xbox 360)
- Designer: Mike Booth
- Writer: Chet Faliszek
- Composer: Mike Morasky
- Series: Left 4 Dead
- Engine: Source
- Platforms: Windows; Xbox 360; Mac OS X
- Release: November 17, 2008: Microsoft Windows; WW: November 18, 2008; Xbox 360; NA: November 18, 2008; AU: November 18, 2008; EU: November 21, 2008; Mac OS X; WW: October 27, 2010
- Genre: First-person shooter
- Modes: Single-player, multiplayer

Left 4 Dead is a 2008 first-person shooter game developed by Valve South and published by Valve. It was originally released for Windows and Xbox 360 in November 2008 and for Mac OS X in October 2010, and is the first title in the Left 4 Dead series. Set during the aftermath of a zombie outbreak on the East Coast of the United States, the game pits its four protagonists, dubbed the "Survivors", against hordes of the infected.

Left 4 Dead uses Valve's proprietary Source engine, with four game modes: a single-player mode in which allied characters are controlled by AI, a four-player co-op campaign mode, an eight-player online versus mode, and a four-player survival mode. In all modes, an artificial intelligence dubbed the "Director" controls level pacing and item placements in an attempt to create a dynamic experience and increase replay value.

Left 4 Dead received praise for its replay value, focus on cooperative play, and cinematic feel, although some criticized its limited level selection and lack of narrative. Considered one of the greatest video games ever made, the game won several publication awards, as well as distinctions from the Academy of Interactive Arts & Sciences and British Academy of Film and Television Arts. As was done with Team Fortress 2, Valve supplemented the game with free downloadable content. The success of the game led to the development of the sequel Left 4 Dead 2, which was released in 2009. In 2012, all Left 4 Dead campaigns were ported to Left 4 Dead 2, with cross-platform multiplayer support between Windows and Mac versions of the game.

== Gameplay ==
Left 4 Dead is a first-person shooter in which the player takes control of one of four survivors; if human players are not available, the remaining survivors are filled by AI-controlled bots. They play through campaigns fighting off the infected—living humans who have been infected with a rabies-like virus that causes psychosis. The overarching goal is not to clear infected, but only to reach the next safe area alive. This is compounded by the presence of an "AI Director", who tracks each player's current situation, and will add or remove items and infected in response; with the goal of maintaining constant tension and creating a new experience with each playthrough.

In Left 4 Dead, the four survivors must fight off infected humans while trying to make their way to a safe house/rescue vehicle.

While a shooter, the game focuses largely on cooperation and teamwork, and thus eschews some "realism" conventions usual in other FPS games. Colored outlines of teammates are visible through walls to help players stick together and coordinate their movement. If a survivor's health is depleted, they become incapacitated and can only be helped by another survivor, after which they continue playing with lower health. If they are incapacitated twice without healing, the third incapacitation will kill them.

During "Campaign" mode, if a survivor is killed, they will eventually respawn in a closet or small room, but must be freed by another survivor to rejoin the team. The AI will not open "respawn closets", so if all human player survivors are incapacitated, the level will restart. Survivors can share first-aid kits and pain pills, and heal each other. Left 4 Dead has friendly fire, increasing the need for caution and coordination around other survivors.

Via a quick menu, the survivors can communicate and organize with voice commands and callouts. Over 1,000 unique lines were recorded for each survivor. Additional communication of player actions is conveyed through lights; weapon-mounted flashlights and muzzle flashes help players determine when their companions are shooting, performing melee attacks, reloading or moving. (Due to control issues and the likelihood of players using a headset, the Xbox 360 version of Left 4 Dead omits the quick phrases feature.)

=== Campaigns ===
All original campaigns are divided into five levels, connected by safehouses; checkpoints where players can heal, re-arm and revive characters who were killed. Some levels are broken up with "crescendo events", which introduce a new obstacle before the survivors can continue moving. In the final chapter of each campaign, the players must defend a position from an onslaught of infected until rescue arrives. The four campaigns are: "No Mercy", a city culminating in a hospital skyscraper; "Death Toll", a small town and countryside; "Dead Air", a bombed city and an airport; and "Blood Harvest", a woodland and farm setting.

A two-level DLC campaign, "Crash Course", was released on September 29, 2009, set in the industrial outskirts between "No Mercy" and "Death Toll". "The Sacrifice" is a three-level campaign released on October 5, 2010, with an industrial port-side setting in Georgia. These new levels contain a number of alternate routes to follow with more supplies, helping to create a sense of non-linearity. Each campaign typically lasts between 20 and 75 minutes depending on the difficulty level. Both platform versions of the game utilize an achievement system.

=== Weapons ===
Each player starts the game with a semiautomatic pistol, an M1911. It is the only weapon with unlimited ammo, and the only weapon that can be used while incapacitated. (If a second pistol is found, the player can dual wield them.) At the beginning of each campaign, survivors can choose between a submachine gun and a pump-action shotgun. As the survivors progress through a campaign, more powerful weapons can be found; the full-auto assault rifle, a semi-automatic shotgun, and a scoped hunting rifle.

In addition to firearms, a player can carry three other items: improvised grenades (either a Molotov cocktail, or a pipe bomb with a smoke alarm, designed to attract the infected); a first aid kit, which can be used to heal any survivor, and pain pills, which provide a temporary health boost. A melee attack can always be used to shove away any infected within reach. Also available are environmental weapons, such as gas cans, propane cylinders, and oxygen tanks, which explode when shot. These can be picked up and moved by survivors, but this blocks them from using other weapons at the same time. Rarely, there are strategically placed minigun turrets near crescendo events and finales.

=== Enemies ===
The Infected (voiced by experimental musician Mike Patton [commons, Smoker, and Hunter] and voice actor Fred Tatasciore [Boomer and Tank]) are the enemies of Left 4 Dead, and comparisons have been made with 'zombies' from certain modern films, such as Dawn of the Dead, 28 Days Later, and Quarantine. An important distinction from the former is that the infected are, as cited in the game's manual, living humans infected with a rabies-like pathogen; more similar to the latter two films, rather than undead zombies. While they are never seen eating humans, bite wounds and mutilation are often mentioned. In an interview with 1Up.com, designer Mike Booth commented on the concept of using a pathogen as an inspiration for the setting:

Even though we obviously pushed well beyond the realm of believability with many of our "boss" infected, the core idea of a mind-destroying, civilization-collapsing pathogen is more horrifying to me than magically animated corpses, precisely because it is plausible. Rabies is a good example of a pathogen that can turn a loyal, friendly, protective family pet into a slavering attack machine. It is a virus that reprograms the behaviors of a complex animal – a mammal, in fact. What if something similar happened to humans? Left 4 Dead is one possible answer.

The "common infected" are fast and agile, weak individually, but overwhelming in numbers. They display a special attraction to high-pitched sounds, such as car alarms and the beeping device attached to pipe bombs. They will often chase down these noises while ignoring lower-pitched, louder sounds, such as gunfire. They occasionally attack en masse, referred to as a "horde".

There are five "special" or "boss" infected, whose mutations grant them special attacks. Each of the special infected have a distinctive sound, silhouette, and musical cue, making their presence easily recognizable by players. There are five special infected in Left 4 Dead:

- The Boomer is a bloated infected that can spit vision-impairing bile on the Survivors. This bile attracts hordes of common infected. The Boomer explodes on death, spewing more bile; this came out of the desire to have an enemy players would not want to shoot on sight.
- The Hunter is an agile enemy that can pounce a survivor from long distances, tearing at them until he is pushed off or killed.
- The Smoker is an infected with a long tongue, which can be used to ensnare and drag a survivor back to himself. The survivor may be attacked directly, attacked by the horde while immobile, or left suspended in mid-air. The tongue is only released if a teammate shoves the ensnared survivor, shoots the tongue, or shoots the Smoker, resulting in a vision-obscuring cloud.
- The Tank is a gigantic, muscular infected that has the ability to swipe at survivors, knocking them off their feet and incapacitating them; he can also throw rocks, cars, and other debris at the survivors. The Tank is the most durable of all the special infected, and requires the full support of all survivors to be killed. The Tank appears rarely, usually during crescendo events or finales.
- The Witch is a female infected with long claws, who stays still in one spot. Survivors can often avoid the Witch, but if they disturb her with light, loud noises, gunfire, or getting too close, she will become aggressive and charge. The Witch is the strongest infected in the game, and on the hardest difficulties, will kill a survivor with one hit. She is the only infected not playable by human players in Versus mode.

=== AI Director ===
The artificial intelligence of Left 4 Dead features a dynamic system for game dramatics, pacing and difficulty called the "Director". Instead of fixed spawn points for enemies, the Director places enemies and items in varying positions and quantities based upon each player's current situation, status, skill and location, creating a new experience for each playthrough. The Director also creates mood and tension with emotional cues, such as visual effects, dynamic music, and character communication.

Valve has termed this dynamic set-up "procedural narrative". In addition to the AI Director, there is a second Director that controls music. It was created as a way to keep the soundtrack interesting throughout the game. The music Director monitors what a player has experienced to create an appropriate mix. The process is client-side and done by a multi-track system. Each player hears their own mix, which is being generated as they play through the game; dead spectators will hear their teammates' mix.

A far simpler version of the A.I. Director was previously used for some key battles in Half-Life 2: Episode Two. Valve is looking for ways to apply the Director in their future games to make pacing and difficulty more dynamic.

=== Game modes ===
Left 4 Dead contains four game modes: Campaign, Versus, Survival, and Single-Player. Campaign consists of up to four human-controlled survivors who attempt to make their way between safe rooms and eventually to rescue. In this mode, the special infected are controlled by the AI.

In Versus, there are two teams of four players each. They play each chapter as both Survivors and Infected, swapping sides after each round. The infected team are given vertical pathways, such as pipes and vines, which can be climbed and used for ambushes. Dead survivors do not respawn. If at least one player reaches the safehouse, the survivor team earns 100 points, as well as bonuses based on their health, and the health items still in their inventory. These points are multiplied by the chapter's difficulty level, and the number of survivors who lived. If all survivors are killed, the survivor team only earns points from their progress through the chapter and the difficulty multiplier. The victor is decided by which team scores the highest during the campaign.

Survival mode consists of a timed challenge where players try to survive as long as possible against a never-ending flood of the infected, added in April 2009 in the Survival Pack DLC. Single-player mode is similar to campaign mode, but played offline with three AI-controlled bots as the other survivors. On Xbox 360, other players can join the same console to turn single player into an offline co-op game. Left 4 Dead can also be played through a system link, or local area network. Players have also discovered a way to do splitscreen co-op with the PC version.

== Plot ==
The survivors Francis, Bill, Zoey, and Louis (left to right) on the poster for the "No Mercy" campaign

An outbreak of a highly contagious pathogen nicknamed the "Green Flu" (which causes extreme aggression, mutation to the body cells, loss of higher brain functions, and essential zombification of those who catch it) begins in Pennsylvania. Memorial walls—giving names and obituaries to those who have died in the infection—suggest that the game takes place in October 2009. Two weeks after the first infection, four asymptomatic carrier survivors—Green Beret and Vietnam veteran William "Bill" Overbeck (voiced by Jim French), college student Zoey (voiced by Jen Taylor), district account manager Louis (voiced by Earl Alexander), and outlaw biker Francis (voiced by Vince Valenzuela)—make their way out of the city of Fairfield, only to discover that the infection is creating dangerous mutations in some of its hosts.

After narrowly avoiding the new types of infected, the survivors are alerted by a passing helicopter to an evacuation point at the roof of Mercy Hospital. Fighting their way through the city's streets, subway, and sewers, they are rescued from the hospital's roof by the pilot (voiced by Dennis Bateman), only to discover that he is infected. Zoey is forced to kill him, causing the helicopter to crash in an industrial district outside the city. Finding an armored delivery truck, the group uses it to reach the small town of Riverside. After encountering a paranoid and delirious man (voiced by Nathan Vetterlein) in the local church, they discover that the town is overrun and head to a boathouse for rescue. Contacting a small fishing vessel (owner voiced by John Patrick Lowrie), they are kicked out of the boat at the city of Newburg across the river, finding much of it in flames. Resting in a greenhouse, the survivors are interrupted by a military C-130 Hercules passing overhead, leading them to believe that it will land at the city's airport. The U.S. military had bombed the airport in an attempt to contain the infection, though the runway is partially intact, allowing the survivors to fuel up and escape in the waiting C-130 (pilot voiced by Gary Schwartz).

Like the helicopter before it, this plane also crashes, and the survivors find themselves at the outskirts of the Allegheny National Forest. Following a series of train tracks, the group finally reaches a functioning but abandoned military evacuation point. After answering a radio transmission (soldier voiced by David Scully), they make their final stand against hordes of infected before a military APC arrives to supposedly transport them to Northeast Safe Zone Echo, one of the few remaining safe areas. Instead, they are detained in a military installation, where they learn that they are not immune and are actually asymptomatic carriers who have infected most of their rescuers. Meanwhile, the base is overthrown by a mutiny, attracting hordes of infected. The survivors escape via train and travel south at the insistence of Bill, who believes they can find long-term safety on the islands of the Florida Keys.

At the portside town of Rayford in Georgia, they find a sailboat but must first raise a lift bridge powered by an aging generator alongside two other generators to reach open waters. As the bridge raises, the aging generator gives out. Bill sacrifices himself to restart it so that the others may reach safety. While waiting for the horde to disperse, the three remaining members encounter the survivors from Left 4 Dead 2. They agree to help the other survivors re-lower the bridge so that they can cross in their car. Louis, Zoey, and Francis then board their boat and set sail for the Florida Keys.

== Development ==
=== Pre-production ===
The concept of Left 4 Dead had its origins in a modification created by Turtle Rock Studios for Counter-Strike: Condition Zero, which they were co-developing with Valve. This mod, named "Terror Strike", saw four players assigned as the terrorists with the goal to plant a bomb and then defend it from unending waves of counter-terrorists. Turtle Rock also were co-developers of Counter-Strike: Source, in which they refined the mod, refining the assets to make it more horror themed and having the players fight off zombies. Turtle Rock had attempted to get Valve to publish "Terror Strike" as its own game, but did not gain any traction until Valve writer Chet Faliszek discovered the project and championed it to Valve's CEO, Gabe Newell. Both versions of "Terror Strike" for Condition Zero and Source eventually were released to the Internet in 2023.

With Valve's approval, development on Left 4 Dead started in mid-2005, and grew significantly larger after Faliszek became lead of the project from Valve's side, bringing in over 100 Valve employees to help expand production. Turtle Rock aimed to create a horror film-inspired game that merges single player games' character-driven narrative structure with multiplayer games' social interaction and high replayability.

To give Left 4 Dead significant exposure, Valve financed a $10-million marketing campaign for the game in the United States and Europe, with advertisements appearing on television, print, websites and outdoor placements in many cities. Valve also hosted photo contests called, "Dude, where's my thumb?" offering copies of Left 4 Dead to people who submitted the best picture involving zombies or the outdoor advertising.

=== Production ===
Left 4 Dead uses the 2008 version of Valve's Source engine, with improvements such as multi-core processor support and physics-based animation to more realistically portray hair and clothing, and to improve physics interaction with enemies when shot or shoved in different body parts. Animation was also improved to allow characters to lean realistically when moving in curved paths. Rendering and artificial intelligence were scaled up to allow for a greater number of enemies who can navigate the world in better ways, such as climbing, jumping, or breaking obstacles. Lighting was enhanced with new self-shadowing normal mapping and advanced shadow rendering that is important to convey information about the environment and player actions. Wet surfaces and fog are used to create mood. Many kinds of post processing cinematic visual effects inspired by horror movies have been added to the game. There is dynamic color correction that accentuates details based on importance, contrast and sharpening to focus attention on critical areas, film grain to expose details or imply details in dark areas and vignetting to evoke tension and a horror-film look.

Left 4 Dead underwent many phases of development; influenced by playtesting, Turtle Rock Studios removed many of the features that were originally in the game. In early development, there was another special infected, the "Screamer", which had no attacks but upon spotting a survivor would run to a safe place and then emit a loud scream that attracted a horde of infected. This infected was removed, but its ability to attract the horde was incorporated into the Boomer's vomit. A persistent merit/demerit system was envisioned to provide positive feedback for good behavior, such as aiding a fallen teammate; and negative feedback for poor behavior, such as shooting a teammate. This would provide a score to rank a player's effectiveness as a teammate, but this system was removed late in the development of the game in favor of immediate, non-persistent feedback displayed in-game. Another significant element removed was a long introduction between campaigns; because the game is designed for replayability, it was difficult to hold the player's attention for repeated viewings of cut scenes, so they were dropped in favor of a sparse narrative. In early development, the game began with a big city level with many routes for the survivors, but playtesters were confused when they began to play, and later they always chose the same route; ultimately Turtle Rock Studios cut the city maps into the first "No Mercy" and "Dead Air" campaigns.

Certain Affinity assisted Turtle Rock Studios with the Xbox 360 version of the game. The Xbox 360 version of Left 4 Dead has the same game modes as the PC version but has additional features such as support for split screen, allowing for two players to play offline and online from the same console, and System Link play. Split-screen mode can also be achieved on the PC version, but it requires console commands and may require the modification of controller configuration files; and it is not officially supported. Both versions of the game have a new matchmaking system to simplify the process of finding other players. This new server management system was met with a negative reaction from PC server operators, who, with this system, had very little control over their servers. This led to Valve releasing a series of patches that allowed server operators to remove their server from the matchmaking "pool" of servers or make private servers. Valve runs dedicated servers for both versions of the game.

== Marketing ==
The game was first revealed in the Christmas 2006 publication of PC Gamer UK with a six-page article describing a playthrough at Turtle Rock Studios headquarters. A teaser was released with The Orange Box. The game was first playable at the Showdown 2007 LAN in San Jose and at QuakeCon 2007. Turtle Rock Studios announced Left 4 Dead on November 20, 2006, and was acquired by Valve on January 10, 2008, because of the game and long-standing relationship between the companies. The game opened up to pre-purchasing on Valve's Steam system on October 15, 2008.

To promote the game and provide basic training to players before starting the game, Valve chose to develop a pre-rendered intro movie. This movie was released on Halloween and shows events prior to the beginning of the "No Mercy" campaign. Valve chose an intro movie over in-game training mechanics because they wanted the players to be immediately dropped into a zombie apocalypse. Valve later detailed in their official Left 4 Dead blog how they designed the movie, from a basic animatic in July 2008 to the final result for the launch of the game.

Early access to the Left 4 Dead demo for people who pre-ordered the game began on November 6, 2008, for both Windows and Xbox 360. It gave users access to both online and single-player play in two "scenes" in one "movie" within the game. This promotion was being offered in addition to the ten percent savings for those who pre-order and applies to all Steam Windows pre-orders and all Windows and Xbox 360 pre-orders from GameStop and EB Games in North America. On November 11, the Left 4 Dead demo was made available to all Windows and Xbox 360 gamers worldwide. The Left 4 Dead demo was removed from the Xbox 360 Marketplace and Valve's own Steam after the game's release on November 18, 2008, however it is still available for those that played it.

The demo had many server problems when it launched, primarily Valve's strategy for server management which made it impossible to set up a dedicated private server with administrator controls. However, a stream of patches led to the availability of a server browser and basic private server functionality as well as Valve's acknowledgment of player concerns. It appears that a patch released just before the game itself has resolved many of the connection issues that demo players were having.

On May 1, 2009, the game was released freely via Steam as a one-day trial called "Freaky Free Friday". The trial was then extended to end on Saturday.

On October 5, 2010, the price of the game via Steam was dropped to US$6.80, or a "4-pack" for $20.40, as a promotion coinciding with the release of The Sacrifice DLC.

== Release ==
Left 4 Dead went gold on November 13, 2008, and was released on November 18, 2008, in North America; and on November 21, 2008, in Europe to coincide with the tenth anniversary of the release of Half-Life. The Xbox 360 version and retail copies were published by Electronic Arts.

Valve released a server patch in December 2008 to stop players on Xbox Live from using PC-style cheats. A spokesman from Valve said, "The fix is designed to halt the cheating behavior on the dedicated servers, which accounts for the majority of the co-op and versus modes of play."

A "Game of the Year Edition" of Left 4 Dead was released on the PC and Xbox 360 on May 12, 2009, with updates and new content included on the disc.

In March 2010, Valve announced that it would be bringing the Steam content platform to Mac OS X computers; along with it, they will be providing native versions of existing Valve games including Left 4 Dead and its sequel. The game was released for Mac OS X on October 27, 2010. Left 4 Dead support cross-platform play, allowing Mac players to play alongside PC players on the same servers, and is also part of the "Steam Play" cross-compatible and Steam Cloud titles, allowing a player that has purchased the game on one platform to download and play it on the other platform for free.

=== Downloadable content ===
Valve intended to support the PC version of the game through free content updates and the Xbox 360 version with DLC. On a podcast by Kotaku, writer Chet Faliszek divulged that an announcement regarding DLC for the PC and Xbox 360 would be released "very soon", and that the announcement was delayed by the holiday season. On February 5, 2009, Valve released details about the upcoming downloadable content pack. The two full campaigns of "Death Toll" and "Dead Air" for versus mode—which were previously unavailable—are included, as well as the survival game mode, where the survivors try to survive endless waves of the infected for as long as possible. On February 11, 2009, Valve announced that the downloadable content for the game would be free for both the Xbox 360 and PC; and on April 21, it was released. Survival mode shipped with 16 maps, 15 of them being modified portions of existing maps and one being a new lighthouse-themed level titled "The Last Stand".

On August 4, 2009, Valve announced the second DLC pack. It contains a new campaign called Crash Course, set shortly after the events of the No Mercy campaign, where the Survivors try to get to a Truck Depot after the helicopter they were in crashed. It is available for co-op, versus and survival modes, with various tweaks to game mechanics, and containing new locations and character dialog. The DLC was announced to be released on September 29, 2009, on which date it was released for free for PC, but was accidentally released on Xbox Live at a higher price. The price was amended soon after, and all players who bought the DLC at the higher price were refunded.

An add-on campaign for Left 4 Dead 2, "The Passing", featured the Left 4 Dead survivors meeting the new cast as part of a full campaign. The Left 4 Dead 2 content was set for release in March 2010, however it was delayed until April 22, 2010. To connect the events in "The Passing" to that in Left 4 Dead, Valve released another add-on in October 2010 for both Left 4 Dead and its sequel, entitled "The Sacrifice"; the events of the add-on take place before "The Passing" and tells how the Left 4 Dead survivors come to encounter the group from Left 4 Dead 2, and how one sacrificed themselves for the safety of the others.

=== Updates ===
On May 15, 2009, an open beta test for the Source Development Kit updated to support Left 4 Dead was started under the name of the "Left 4 Dead Authoring tools". This included a new set of plugins that allowed for users to import data from SketchUp, a free 3D modeling program, directly into the Hammer level editor for use in maps. The beta was concluded on June 25, 2009, with the full release of the Left 4 Dead authoring tools and corresponding server and matchmaking update to support custom maps. The update included a command line tool for packaging custom Left 4 Dead campaigns to ease distribution.

On November 9, 2009, a matchmaking update to allow for matchmaking between teams of four players in versus mode was released.

== Related media ==
=== Comics ===
Valve announced a 190-page digital comic that has been revealed in four parts in the weeks leading up to the release of The Sacrifice. Part one was released on September 14, 2010, with a new part scheduled for release each week until The Sacrifice's October 5 release. The comic is illustrated by Mike Oeming, the artist behind the Powers comic series, and tells the stories of the original four survivors, as well as the events leading up to the infection. The comic begins with Bill, having just sacrificed himself to save the others, taking on three tanks while severely wounded. It then cuts to the finale of Blood Harvest, which is revealed to be one week earlier. In The Sacrifice DLC, any player, whether playing as Bill or not, can choose to sacrifice themselves to allow the other survivors to complete the campaign.

=== Other games ===
Overkill Software, the developers of Payday: The Heist, a similar game to Left 4 Dead featuring four player co-operative gameplay, announced in June 2012 that it has worked with Valve to create a DLC level for Payday in the form of a map mirroring the "No Mercy" level from Left 4 Dead, however, this DLC level is not canon to Left 4 Dead and does not lead to the infection that initiated the events in Left 4 Dead.

On August 20, 2015, an update for the game Zombie Army Trilogy was released, which imported the eight survivors from both Left 4 Dead games into ZAT. Downloadable content for Zombie Army 4: Dead War in 2021 included the four Left 4 Dead survivors as playable characters as part of its co-op mode.

The character of Bill was introduced in the game Dead by Daylight in that game's DLC in 2017, and was given an expanded lore scenario around his time in the Vietnam War in additional content released in 2021.

== Reception ==
=== Critical reception ===
Reception

Aggregate score
Aggregator	Score
Metacritic	89/100

Review scores
Publication	Score
1Up.com	A−
Edge	9/10
Electronic Gaming Monthly	A
Eurogamer	9/10
Famitsu	35/40
Game Informer	9.25/10
GameSpot	8.5/10
GameSpy	4.5/5
Giant Bomb	4/5
IGN	9.0/10
Official Xbox Magazine (US)	9.5/10
PC Gamer (UK)	93%
TeamXbox	9.1/10
X-Play	5/5

Left 4 Dead received highly positive reviews from critics. At Metacritic, the game received an aggregated score of 89 out of 100 for both Xbox 360 and PC. IGN stated, "It's almost pitch perfect in how it captures the tension and the action of a Hollywood zombie movie", and went on to describe it as, "quite possibly the perfect co-op shooter." Giant Bomb commented that the Source engine was beginning to show its age, but praised the game's use of lighting and filmic effects that gives the game world, "a desolate, washed-out feeling", as well as the realistic and emotive faces and the engrossing art direction. Eurogamer concluded that Left 4 Dead "is another deeply professional, personality-filled and progressive take on the shooter from Valve." IGN, GameSpot, and 1Up.com praised the game's replayability, but GameSpot criticized the "limited map selection" that could "sometimes feel a bit repetitious". GameSpy noted the lack of an overall narrative between the campaigns was disappointing. However, some reviewers praised its faithfulness to the zombie film genre, including the "deliberately ambiguous" back-story, and the amount of characterization and emotion brought by each of the four survivors. TeamXbox commented that clipping issues hurt the otherwise "incredibly good" visual experience. Hideo Kojima, creator of the Metal Gear series declared in an interview with 1UP.com that he was "addicted to the game", which was, in his view, one of the "core titles made with movie-industry people that explore the depths of hi-def".

=== Sales ===
On October 28, 2008, Valve reported that preorders for Left 4 Dead had beaten those of The Orange Box by 95 percent after the Steam pre-order was launched. On November 21, 2008, the day of the game's release in Europe, Valve issued a press release stating that Left 4 Dead had exceeded the pre-order numbers of The Orange Box by over 160 percent. The Xbox 360 version of Left 4 Dead was the seventh best-selling game of December 2008 in the United States, selling in excess of 629,000 copies. On February 3, Electronic Arts revealed that Left 4 Dead had sold 1.8 million copies, excluding Steam and worldwide sales figures. On March 26, Mike Booth revealed that the game had exceeded 2.5 million sales at retail during a presentation at the Game Developers Conference 2009. On September 24, 2009, Valve announced that almost 3 million copies of the game had been sold. On May 10, 2011, Doug Lombardi mentioned that the game and its sequel have each sold 3 million copies on the Xbox 360. On August 11, 2011, in a phone interview with Giant Bomb, Chet Faliszek said that the series has sold over 11 million units in total.

=== Awards ===
Left 4 Dead received recognition as one of the best multiplayer and PC games of 2008 from various organizations and gaming publications. The game was named the Best Multiplayer Game of 2008 by IGN, GameSpy, Spike TV, NoFrag, and BAFTA; and as the "Computer Game of the Year" by the Academy of Interactive Arts & Sciences (AIAS), Spike TV, and Bit-Tech. Other awards include "Outstanding Achievement in Online Gameplay" from the AIAS (who also nominated it for "Overall Game of the Year"), Best Use of Sound for the PC and Best Shooting game overall from IGN, Father of All FPS from Nofrag, and the best Cooperative Multiplayer and Shooter of 2008 from GameSpot. who also nominated it for Game of the Year.

=== Legacy ===
Left 4 Dead and its sequel created a format for several games that followed that used the same four-player-versus-environment style of gameplay using artificial intelligence similar to the AI Director and encourages strong cooperation between players. Such Left 4 Dead-likes, according to Polygon's Josh Rios, included games like Warhammer: End Times – Vermintide and its sequel, and Deep Rock Galactic, but only about a decade after Left 4 Dead's release did a large number of titles in this genre emerge. Seven of the original Left 4 Dead developers from Turtle Rock Studios were part of the team that released a spiritual successor titled Back 4 Blood in October 2021. Several Left 4 Dead-like games were announced ahead and during E3 2021, including Rainbow Six Extraction, The Anacrusis, Redfall, Warhammer 40,000: Darktide and Evil Dead: The Game. These newer titles typically incorporate role-playing game-like elements atop the core gameplay loop of Left 4 Dead.

== Sequel ==
A sequel, Left 4 Dead 2, was announced at the 2009 E3 conference and was released on November 17, 2009. Addressing concerns voiced by fans, Gabe Newell responded to an email from Kotaku explaining that despite the upcoming sequel, Left 4 Dead would continue to be supported and more content was planned in the coming months.
