= Survival mode =

Game mode

Survival mode, or horde mode, is a game mode in a video game in which the player must continue playing for as long as possible without being defeated in an uninterrupted session while the game presents them with increasingly difficult waves of challenges or enemies. A variant of the mode requires that the player last for a certain finite amount of time or number of waves, after which victory is achieved and the mode ends. Survival mode has been compared to the gameplay of classic arcade games, where players face off against increasingly stronger waves of enemies. This mode was intended to give the game a definite and sometimes sudden ending, so that other players could then play the arcade game as well.

== In tower defense games ==
Rampart, released in 1991, is the first prototypical survival game mode in tower defense games. Survival mode is particularly common among tower defense games, such as Plants vs. Zombies. where the player must improve the defenses of a specific location in order to repel enemy forces for as long as possible.

== In fighting games ==
Power Instinct, released in 1993, added a survival game mode, called 'Life Attack' to their Super Nintendo Port in November 1993. Street Fighter II: The World Warrior on the Game Boy introduced the mode in 1995, and both Tekken 2 and Street Fighter EX included the mode in 1996 and 1997 respectively.

== In cooperative shooter games ==
Killing Floor, originally a total conversion mod for the game Unreal Tournament 2004, first released in 2005, introduced the cooperative wave-based survival game mode. Popular games that have a survival mode include zombie games such as those in the Left 4 Dead series, games in the Call of Duty series following Call of Duty: World at War, Gears of War 2 introduced the term "horde mode" as an alternative name for survival mode, and subsequently picked up by other games such as World War Z.

== In sandbox games ==
Many sandbox games, such as Minecraft, take advantage of this game mode by having players survive the night time from a variety of monsters, such as skeletons and zombies. Another sandbox game, Rust, uses both non-player characters and other players as enemies, inviting player vs player combat in order to survive in the game's environment.
