= Chet Faliszek =

American video game writer (born 1965)

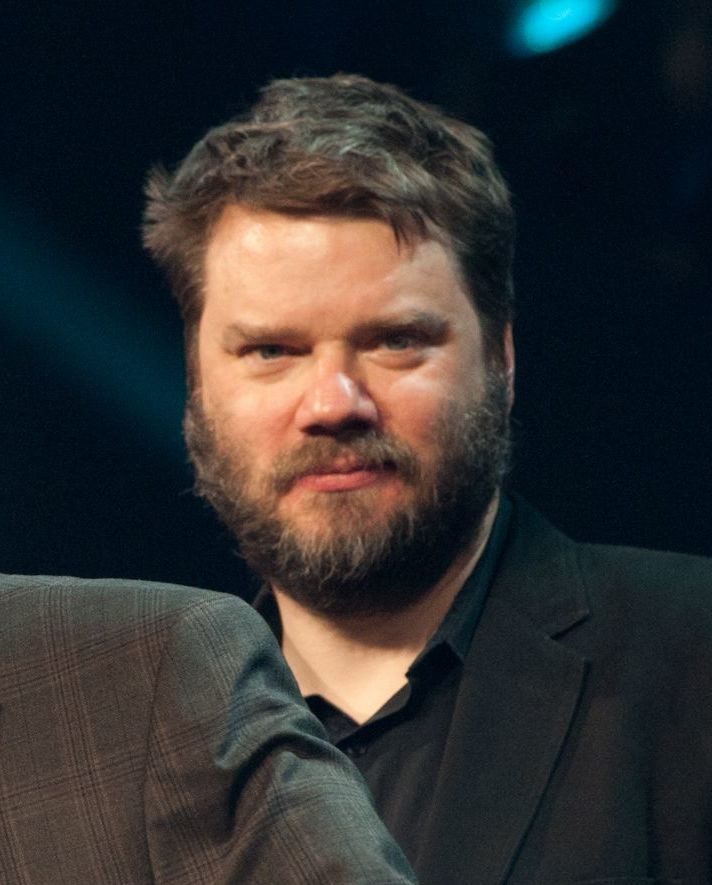
- Faliszek in 2012
- Born: 1965 (age 60–61); United States
- Occupation: Video game writer
- Employer(s): Stray Bombay Company, Vertigo Games, Valve

Chet Faliszek (/ˈfɑːlɪsɛk/; born 1965) is an American video game writer who has worked for companies like Valve and Bossa Studios, having been involved in the story writing for series such as Half-Life, Portal, and Left 4 Dead.

== Career ==
Faliszek first gained recognition as the co-creator of the satirical Old Man Murray website along with Erik Wolpaw around 1997, and which ran until 2002.

=== Valve ===
Faliszek's and Wolpaw's writings led to them being hired by Valve circa 2005. Along with Wolpaw and Marc Laidlaw, Faliszek helped to create the storylines for the Half-Life and Portal series, along with having personally written the story for Left 4 Dead. He was also involved with Valve's work in virtual reality (VR) through the HTC Vive. In May 2017, Faliszek announced that after twelve years with Valve, he had left the company earlier in the year to work on unannounced projects.

=== Bossa and Vertigo ===
By September 2017, Faliszek had joined London-based Bossa Studios, and led Bossa's new Seattle-based studio. He was working on an unannounced cooperative game that is "trying to do something new in the narrative space using [artificial intelligence]". In May 2018, Faliszek announced he had also joined the board of advisers for Vertigo Games, and will help support a virtual reality title they are currently developing.

After about a year at Bossa, Faliszek and Bossa agreed that what Faliszek had planned was not working out, in part due to his envisioned game not being the type of product Bossa had worked on before, and Faliszek left the company early in 2019. By March 2019, he founded a new studio, Stray Bombay Company, along with Riot Games' Kimberly Voll, in essence to continue the development of the cooperative title. Faliszek had previously met Voll around 2012 while Valve was exploring the VR space, and had helped Voll get Radial Games Fantastic Contraption as a SteamVR launch title. Faliszek found Voll's focus on player interaction a key part of his idea for the cooperative game. Stray Bombay was backed financially by both Riot and Upfront Ventures. The company's first game is The Anacrusis, which was released via early access in January 2022, and fully launched December 5th, 2023.

Starting around 2023, Faliszek began to post TikToks and YouTube videos about his time at Valve, experiences in the games industry, and his views on game design.

He would make a video about Stop Killing Games, disagreeing with the movement.

== Works ==
Year	Title	Credits
2006	Half-Life 2: Episode One	Writer
2007	Portal	Writer
2007	Half-Life 2: Episode Two	Writer
2007	Team Fortress 2	Writer
2008	Left 4 Dead	Writer
2009	Left 4 Dead 2	Writer
2011	Portal 2	Writer
2012	Counter-Strike: Global Offensive	Writer
2023	The Anacrusis	Project Lead
