= United Kingdom eSports Association =

ESports governing body

- Formation: 31 October 2008; 18 years ago
- Dissolved: December 2011; 14 years ago
- Purpose: National governing body of esports
- Headquarters: United Kingdom
- Chief Executive: Ray Mia
- Executive Committee: Duncan Best; Richard Keith; Steve Carsey; James Claydon; Crawford Balch
- Community Council: Peter Simpson; Stuart Saw (2009); Richard Lewis (2009); Michael O'Dell (2009)
- Website: ukesa.co.uk

The United Kingdom eSports Association or UKeSA (pronounced You-Kes-Sah) attempted to be a governing body of eSports in the United Kingdom and a member of the International eSports Federation (IeSF). The headquarters were in London, United Kingdom.

The UKeSA was responsible for governing amateur and professional eSports, building a structure with the government, industry and community in mind. These include Metropolitan Police Service, BBC, Entertainment and Leisure Software Publishers Association, Procter & Gamble, Future Publishing, Electronic Arts, Codemasters, The New World Assembly, XLEAGUE.TV, Team Dignitas, Reason Gaming, Team Infused, Fnatic, QuadV and Cadred. The association was launched on 31 October 2008 during the London Games Festival and was chaired by former XLEAGUE.TV channel head Ray Mia. He explained that UKeSA will essentially be the eSports equivalent of The Football Association, offering a centralised infrastructure to UK eSports as well as support towards semi-professional and professional team and UK community led projects with the government.

UKeSA set up leagues and cup tournaments, split between three divisions: Open Division, Championship Division and Premiership Division. Each division represents the different levels of competition from amateur to professional and is played online via the internet through the means of a personal computer or a video games console. Teams can compete in a series of video games including FIFA 09, Call of Duty 4 and Counter-Strike. Competition finals of these divisions were hosted at a specially selected venue in the United Kingdom. Teams are gathered to play against each other in off-line, local area network (LAN) setups as opposed to online play in the initial stages of the tournament.

== History ==
31 October 2008 sees the official launch of the United Kingdom eSports Association during the 2008 London Games Festival in London. The launch party was held at the Haymarket branch of the Sports Cafe.

On 26 November 2008, it has been announced that several of the following organisations, both private and public sector, have been involved in the setup of UKeSA: Metropolitan Police Service, BBC, Entertainment and Leisure Software Publishers Association, Procter & Gamble, Future Publishing, Electronic Arts, Codemasters, The New World Assembly, XLEAGUE.TV, Team Dignitas, Reason Gaming, Team Infused, Fnatic, QuadV and Cadred.

The Executive Committee of UKeSA were announced on 12 January 2009. Members consist of personnel from the likes of Entertainment and Leisure Software Publishers Association, British Broadcasting Association and Future Publishing.

£35,000 GBP prize fund was announced for the Championship and Premiership Divisions on 13 January 2009. A selection of video game titles were listed as part of the Open Division.

Future Publishing are partnering with UKeSA and aligning itself with the Open Division, announced on 23 January 2009.

A selection of video game titles were announced for the Championship Division on 27 January 2009. They were chosen from the amount of sign ups in the Open Division. Top four titles will be picked to represent the Premiership Division.

On 6 February 2009, UK Internet Service Provider, Be Unlimited has become the official broadband provider sponsor of UKeSA for 2009.

UKeSA has announced the selection of eSports teams to represent and play in the Premiership Division on 13 February 2009. They include established teams such as Team Dignitas, The Imperial, Crack Clan and Team Coolermaster.

Dell becomes the sponsor for UKeSA's Premiership Division on 17 February 2009.

UKeSA opens up nominations and voting for the Community Committee on 25 February 2009. They also increased the prize fund for the UKeSA Championship and Premiership Division from £35,000 to £40,000.

On 18 March 2009, UKeSA have appointed Richard 'Dr. Gonzo' Lewis, Michael 'ODEE' O'Dell and Stuart 'TosspoT' Saw as the elected Community Council members.

On 2 April 2009, HMV and UKeSA have announced that they are pairing up to organise the "GameOn! London" exhibition at the Olympia Exhibition Centre, London, which takes place in June 2009.

The governing body signs up to become a member of the International eSports Federation.

In December 2009, amid controversy, the UKeSA signed for bankruptcy and has since made no attempt to pay back any individual or organisation it owed.

== Committee Structure ==
The UKeSA structure is made up of three key committees and a players union. Each committee plays a vital role in the operations of the eSports Association. So far, only the Executive Committee and the Community Council has been officially announced.

The Executive Committees purpose is to assist, direct and act as ambassadors for UK eSports to the wider public. The Committee shall be composed of prominent industry, media and government figures and shall include senior representatives from the games industry.

- Ray Mia - Chief Executive, United Kingdom eSports Association (UKeSA)
- Duncan Best - Director, Entertainment and Leisure Software Publishers Association (ELSPA)
- Richard Keith – Director, Future PLC
- Steve Carsey – Deputy CEO/Creative Director, Steadfast Television/Apace Media
- James Claydon – Head of News & Entertainment, BBC Motion Gallery (BBC Worldwide) and CEO of London Features International & Idols
- Crawford Balch – Senior Manager, Reid & Casement

The Community Council consists of six people: Three elected members of the UK eSports community, two permanent Executive Committee members of the UKeSA and one Senior Operational Manager. Originally, the three elected members of the eSports community had to be Team Managers from Championship or Premiership Teams. This was changed to make the Community Council both representative and inclusive of the UK eSports community. However, candidates must be UK passport holders and they must reside in the United Kingdom.

Candidates put themselves up for electoral status and are given an opportunity to state their wishes as to why they should be chosen for the Community Council. Questions are then submitted to the candidates by the public and are then answered by writing or through a live debate broadcast on Internet Protocol Television (IPTV) or web-streaming.

Voting for potential Community Council members are done via public vote and are tallied via electronic means, such as a website. Voters are allowed to vote for 3 candidates and can only choose once per election. Elected members are not able to sit in the Community Council for two consecutive terms, however, they are able to be re-elected after standing down from a single term. No length of time has been given as to indicate how long these terms are.

Elected members of the committee are responsible for community related operational and disciplinary matters. These include the enforcement of game, tournament and cup regulations and rules, disciplinary breaches of regulations and conduct, allocation of the seasonal cash retainers, game type and rule suggestions and responsibility for video game specific sub-committees. Attendance is required for Community Committee members through bi-monthly conference calls and physical meetings by attending the General Assembly.

On 18 March 2009, UKeSA have announced the results of the elections for the Community Council. The following will be sitting in as members of the Community Council for one term:

- Richard Lewis - Freelance writer and former eSports manager.
- Michael O'Dell - General Manager, Team Dignitas.
- Stuart Saw - eSports Commentator, QuadV.

Also on the board for the Community Council is Ray Mia, who sits in as the permanent Executive Committee members of the Council and Peter Simpson as the Senior Operational Manager.

The Ethics Commission is charged with defining and updating a framework of ethical principles, including a Code of Ethics & Conduct, based upon the values and principles enshrined in the UKeSA Charter.

The Players Association is a separate entity that is supported by the UKeSA. This body, once established will be permanently represented on the Ethics Commission.

== General Assembly ==
Meetings are set up between the Executive Committee, Community Council, Ethics Commission, Players Association and other leading figures among the government, the eSports community (such as the International eSports Federation) and video games industry. Held three times a year, these meetings consist of debated issues concerning eSports in the United Kingdom, how they relate to operational aspects of UKeSA and the endorsement of the UKeSA Charter. The General Assembly is invitational only, with permanent membership endorsed by elective procedures.

== Competition structure ==
Competitions are split into three divisions, some of which will comprise a league and a cup tournament. Each of the divisions represent the different levels, citing grassroots amateur level to the professional level. There are three seasons per year, which last approximately three months per season. Teams from each division can face promotions and relegation depending on how they perform in each of the leagues during the season. Throughout each of the seasons, a trophy cup tournament is held between teams of the Open and Championship Division. Competition finals of the Cup Tournament, Championship and Premiership divisions are hosted at a specially selected venue in the United Kingdom each season. Qualifying eSports teams are gathered to play against each other in offline, local area network (LAN) setups as opposed to online play in the initial stages of the tournament.

The Open Division represents the grassroots of eSports and form part of the amateur competitions. Playing restrictions are set to a minimum standard and games are played for fun or for practise. Because the Open Division is viewed as the amateur level of eSports, many teams that participate are generally those who have just started or want to determine whether they are suitable at competitive level before moving to the semi-professional side of eSports.

The Championship Division represents the semi-professional competition level. Teams that choose to play in this division are generally groups who wish to move to the next stage of eSports and play for financial gain. Many of these team are established and may have squads for each individual game/title. Teams can be promoted from this division into the Premiership Division, through participation. Support and training are given to teams to aid their development. Such training includes both management and business elements, which is seen as crucial to building a team into global brand.

The Premiership Division represents the professional level. Teams are given retainers to support themselves and develop their internal infrastructure as well as business support and training. Teams can be demoted through participation of competitions and must follow guidelines and rules throughout their participation.

A seasonal Cup Tournament is held between the teams of the Open Division and the Championship Division. Teams are required to pay to enter and games are then carried out online. The final remaining teams will face at an offline, local area network (LAN) event. Premiership Division teams are not allowed to enter.

== Teams ==
Currently, there are 13 selected eSports teams that represent the professional level of eSports. These teams participate in the UKeSA Premiership Division and play in different leagues that represent the video games they compete in. These teams are given media coverage through website editorials, terrestrial, satellite and cable television, internet protocol television and podcast. Business, management and financial support are given throughout the season, offering training managerial skills and business development, which will prepare the teams for sponsorships from companies like Dell, Adidas and other major business companies. Retainers are paid to Premiership teams at the end of each season, which will give financial support they need to carry on pushing the team brand as a primary business.

The number of Championship Division teams are determined by several factors such as paid entry fees and completion of team data like video game user identification tags, with teams submitting themselves for the competition each season. These teams are working towards being promoted into the UKeSA Premiership Division, which will offer the team the support they need to get their brand off the ground. Teams in the UKeSA Championship Division are given limited support for business and management training, while financial support comes from winning the competition.

== Competitive Video Games ==
There are a total of 17 video game titles currently used throughout the different divisions. They consist from a range of first person shooters, driving simulation, beat 'em ups, real-time strategy, sports simulation and rhythm action genres. Each of the video game titles have some element of competitive online and offline multiplayer modes, which allow the players to play against each other, specifically using competitive gaming rules set by UKeSA.

New video games titles are added when the eSports community requests for the inclusion in the competition. Titles are first placed into the Open Division to gauge the amount of sign-ups for that specific video game. If enough players register in the Open Division, UKeSA will move to include it into the semi-professional, Championship Division, where eSports athletes will be able to register to play for the prize fund. If a particular video game title is popular enough in the Championship Division, UKeSA will warrant that video game a place in the Premiership Division.

Not all video game titles are suitable for use in a competitive environment as certain video game titles do not allow private sessions hosted by the players via peer-to-peer or server-led gaming rooms. Such games include UbiSoft's EndWar, where online play is restricted to its open Theatre of War lobby system.

Competitive Video Game Titles (Updated: March 2009)
Divisions	Game Titles	Format	Year	No. of Seasons
Open	Call Of Duty 4	Xbox 360 / PC / PS3	2009	1
Open	Company of Heroes	PC	2009	1
Open	Counter-Strike 1.6	PC	2009	1
Open	Counter-Strike: Condition Zero	PC	2009	1
Open	Counter-Strike: Source	PC	2009	1
Open	Day of Defeat: Source	PC	2009	1
Open	FIFA 09	Xbox 360 / PC / PS3	2009	1
Open	Forza Motorsport 2	Xbox 360	2009	1
Open	Gears of War 2	Xbox 360	2009	1
Open	Guitar Hero 3	Xbox 360	2009	1
Open	Halo 3	Xbox 360	2009	1
Open	Mario Kart Wii	Wii	2009	1
Open	Pro Evolution Soccer 2009	PS3	2009	1
Open	Rainbow Six: Vegas 2	Xbox 360	2009	1
Open	Super Smash Bros. Brawl	Wii	2009	1
Open	Team Fortress 2	PC	2009	1
Open	Warcraft 3	PC	2009	1
Championship	Call Of Duty 4	Xbox 360 / PC	2009	1
Championship	Counter-Strike 1.6	PC	2009	1
Championship	Counter-Strike: Source	PC	2009	1
Championship	FIFA 09	Xbox 360 / PS3	2009	1
Championship	Halo 3	Xbox 360	2009	1
Championship	Team Fortress 2	PC	2009	1
Premiership	Call Of Duty 4	PC	2009	1
Premiership	Counter-Strike: Source	PC	2009	1
Premiership	FIFA 09	Xbox 360 / PS3	2009	1
Premiership	Team Fortress 2	PC	2009	1
Cup	Call Of Duty 4	PC	2009	1
Cup	Counter-Strike: Source	PC	2009	1
Cup	FIFA 09	Xbox 360	2009	1
Cup	Team Fortress 2	PC	2009	1

== Membership To The International eSport Federation ==
The association was one of the members of the International eSport Federation (IeSF) alongside the following eSports associations:

- eSport Verband Österreich (Austria)
- Belgian Electronic Sport Federation (Belgium),
- E-sport Denmark (Denmark),
- Deutscher eSport Bund (Germany),
- Nederlandse Electronic Sport Bond (Netherlands),
- Swiss E-sport Federation (Switzerland),
- Korea e-Sports Association (South Korea),
- Taiwan eSports League (Taiwan)
- eSports Vietnam (Vietnam).

Japan, Bulgaria and China were also looking to join the federation at the GStar 2008 exhibition held in South Korea.

== Future developments ==
UKeSA filed for bankruptcy whilst owing a large number of teams, players and industry related companies significant sums of money (http://www.cadred.org/News/Article/88207/)

== Misconception ==
UKeSA are not to be confused by the Electronic Sports Ltd's eSports competitions organized by Richard Millington and Morgan Olsson under the same name from 2002 to 2005.
