= DG2 =

DG2 can refer to

- Discrete Graphics 2, a graphics card made by Intel, later renamed to Intel Arc Alchemist
- The 2014 video game Defense Grid 2.
