= Tactical Intervention =

2013 video game

- Developer: FIX Korea
- Publisher: OGPlanet
- Designer: Minh Le
- Engine: Modified Source
- Platform: Microsoft Windows Mac OS X
- Release: March 28, 2013
- Genre: First-person shooter
- Mode: Multiplayer

Tactical Intervention was a video game developed by Minh "Gooseman" Le, the co-creator of Counter-Strike. It was a multiplayer first-person shooter in which a team of counter-terrorists face off against a team of terrorists, much like Counter-Strike. The game featured dogs, riot shields and the ability to rappel. Tactical Intervention entered closed beta for North America on May 28, 2010; however, this did not result in the release of the game. OGPlanet has since picked up Tactical Intervention for release in North America. The game has also since been shown at GDC 2012 in San Francisco, where Gooseman demonstrated the game and was interviewed by various gaming media including GameTrailers, IGN, GameSpot and more. Joystiq launched its exclusive beta on March 4 until March 8. OGPlanet launched the open beta from the March 14 up to the March 25. They also revealed the game's release date as March 28, 2013.

On June 10, 2013, game servers were brought down because "player involvement has yet to reach a level for OGPlanet to sustain its future service".

The game was later picked up by German publisher RNTS games and appeared at Gamescom in Cologne, Germany in August 2013. The game was also released on Steam worldwide with RNTS.

On October 2, 2017, the game's servers were announced to be shutting down, citing severe financial issues and a declining playerbase.

== Reception ==
Reception

Aggregate score
Aggregator	Score
Metacritic	47/100

Review scores
Publication	Score
Destructoid	4.5/10
Eurogamer	4/10
GameStar	48/100

Tactical Intervention received negative reviews upon its full release. On Metacritic, the game holds a score of 47/100 based on 7 reviews, indicating "generally unfavorable reviews".
