= Xleague.tv =

Video games broadcaster

XLEAGUE.TV
- Country: United Kingdom

Programming
- Picture format: 576i

Ownership
- Owner: TNWA Group; Portland TV (previous owner)

History
- Launched: 16 May 2007
- Closed: 1 March 2009

XLEAGUE.TV was a broadcast production unit owned by The New World Assembly Group, creating and providing content on its primary subject of video games. It covered competitive video gaming by providing coverage for organisers including the Electronic Sports League and United Kingdom eSports Association.

== History ==
XLEAGUE.TV was launched on Sky channel 291, on 16 May 2007.

The channel partnered with EVS Broadcast Equipment, to use its live outside broadcast digital video production systems on television productions.

Fresh new programming was announced to air alongside its existing line-up of shows. This was the result of community feedback from its viewers.

On 12 October 2007, the channel announced that it was partnering with fellow UK tournament organisers, Enemy Down to run a series of team games for titles including Counter-Strike: Source in the Packard Bell European Open, which the hardware manufacturer will be supporting with prizes.

On 8 November 2007, XLEAGUE.TV announced a brand alliance with the Alex Zane Breakfast Show on UK radio station, XFM.

It was revealed on 22 January 2008 that the channel had entered into an agreement with US men's entertainment channel MavTV, who had provided the niche sports content.

The channel rebranded as Pulse on 13 February 2008, which was made up of separately branded XLEAGUE.TV and MavTV blocks. The EPG channel number moved to Sky channel 208. The channel still retained all the XLEAGUE programmes and website, prior to the rebrand.

XLEAGUE.TV, alongside the Metropolitan Police Service, TNWA Group, Packard Bell, London Borough of Southwark, Microsoft and Electronic Arts launched Project Gamerz on 28 February 2008, an initiative to bring eSports to the local community.

In February 2008, the channel held its biggest prize funded event yet and was the biggest Halo 3 tournament Europe had seen. From September 2007, the teams had been playing to fight to the top of the leaderboard, and in February 2008, the finals were held in the studios and broadcast on the channel. The Incredibles (now Team Dignitas – http://www.team-dignitas.net/)%5B%5D came 1st and won 5k between them. Team Devastation (http://www.devastationuk.com)%5B%5D came second and won 2.5k to share. This was the last tournament XLEAGUE held.

Pulse continued with its "brand block" by introducing Martial Arts TV onto the channel on 8 July 2008.

Portland TV denied that XLEAGUE.TV has been axed. The channel was in a consultation period and reassessing its content and format.

On 6 February 2009, it was announced that it had been bought out by TNWA Group and that it will become a productions unit to create shows for other outlets. Its online operations has been merged with Enemy Down.

== The channel ==
When XLEAGUE.TV was previously owned by Portland TV, it was an eSports channel concentrating on the competitive side of video gaming. In this respect, it differed from other examples of video game programming in the country, such as Cybernet, which had a broader remit, to cover video games in general. The channel was closely paired to its own self-titled website. The online resource encouraged community discussion, while also serving as a platform to organise tournaments and invitational events, some of which may later be screened, on the channel, via its flagship programme, The Match.

The website provided interviews with standout competitors, be they clans or individuals. General news updates were provided from the world of gaming, along with the ability to sign up to participate in league or tournaments, in the search of recognition, fun and prizes. Some games offer sponsored free-play, whilst others required a subscription for entrance.

Users could upload videos they have created on the website as well. The site also offered a community podcast in the form of Talkback, in which the XLEAGUE.TV community and channel staff offered their views on raised concerns, and filled the audience in as to upcoming highlights.

The channel went through a rebrand, where XLEAGUE.TV became a "brand block", alongside MavTV, Cultra and Martial Arts TV on Pulse, an entertainment channel previously on the British Sky Broadcasting satellite network in both Ireland and the United Kingdom.

== Recent programmes and projects ==
Since its departure as a television channel, the production unit has produced or has been involved in the following:

- UKeSA Season 1 Grand Finals –

XLEAGUE.TV and QuadV worked together to broadcast the United Kingdom eSports Association Season One finals over IPTV via QuadV.com and Enemydown.eu.

== Xleague Shows ==
A wealth of shows were produced during the air of its television channel on the British Sky Broadcasting platform:

- Casual Gaming Show – Runtime: 60 mins / Episodes: 1

Aimed at a younger audience, the show was family orientated, and offered a competitive but fun way of playing against one another. It only lasted one episode.

- Download – Runtime: 30 mins / Episodes: 3

Weekly gadgets and film review show, which looked at the latest technological products and digital movies.

- eSports Weekly – Runtime: 15–30 mins / Episodes: 9

eSports Weekly was a news magazine, reporting on the activities and results of competitive video games competition around the world.

- Game60 – Runtime: 1 min / Episode: Unknown

Game60 was a news programme which aired for sixty seconds and broadcast daily.

- Games Night – Runtime: 30–60 mins / Episodes: 32

Games Night was a discussion and review show that aimed to discuss issues suggested for inclusion by members of the XLEAGUE.TV forums. Special guests were selected from a pool of recognised community members, pro-gamers and industry experts.

The show went on to win the Intent Media's Games Media Awards in 2008, taking the Games Broadcast category.

- Gear Slot – Runtime: 15 mins / Episodes: 3
- Guru Larry's Retro Corner – Runtime: 15 mins / Episodes: 49

Guru Larry's Retro Corner was a weekly segment hosted by "Guru Larry" Bundy Jr, which covered a different title from gaming history.

- H3O – Runtime: 30 mins / Episodes: 13

A magazine style show dedicated to the Halo franchise. The show covered news, such as the expansion map packs, and the competitive nature around the world.

- Inside Gaming – Runtime: 15–60 mins / Episodes: 45

Inside Gaming was a documentary, in which a reporter cover key events related to gaming. It often covered interviews from key people in the industry, as well as pre-release video game events, and eSports competitions.

- Reviewmageddon – Runtime: 15–30 mins / Episodes: Unknown

Reviewmageddon was an alternative review show, which took a light-hearted, humorous look at video game titles. The show was originally fifteen minutes in length, but due to its popularity, the show was increased to a full thirty minutes after the fourth episode.

- Road to Berlin: FIFA Interactive World Cup – Runtime: 30 mins / Episodes: 6

Road to Berlin was an off-the-wall documentary and studio discussion series following potential UK champions of the Electronic Arts' FIFA video game.

- The Chart – Runtime: 30 mins / Episodes: Unknown

The Chart was a weekly video game chart show, compiled from the Entertainment and Leisure Software Publishers Association video game sales charts.

- The Edge – Runtime: 15 mins / Episodes: 1

The Edge was a video games guide on how to play a particular video game at a competitive level, generally narrated by professional eSports players.

- The Match – Runtime: 45–90 mins / Episodes: Unknown

The Match was a studio based show, delivering highlights from tournament and league play from eSports competitions.

- Trailblazers – Runtime: 15 mins / Episodes: 14

Trailblazers showed the latest trailers from games to be released in the future.

- Wez and Larry's Top Tens – Runtime: 30 mins / Episodes: 10

Wez and Larry's Top Tens was a comedy based top ten series presented by Larry Bundy Jr and Wesley Lock featuring the best and the worst of the gaming world.
