= Action Half-Life =

Action Half-life
- Developers: The A-team (Akimbo Team Productions, LLC)
- Engine: GoldSrc
- Platform: Microsoft Windows
- Release: 1999
- Genre: First-person shooter
- Mode: Multiplayer

Action Half-Life is a mod for the first-person shooter video game Half-Life. It strives to simulate action movies, especially those directed by John Woo.

Action Half-Life is the second mod in the "Action" series. The first was Action Quake 2 and the third was Action Unreal Tournament 2004.

== Gameplay ==
The traditional mode of gameplay is Deathmatch; at the start of a round, players must choose a single pistol, a unique weapon, and a special item. Unlike the buy menu in Counter-Strike, these weapons are free and have limited ammunition, which makes tactical usage crucial. The game also includes a "last man standing" mode, which plays like a deathmatch, but without respawning after death.

Action Half-life also features a single player mode. Some unique features in this mode include a move called "Adrenaline Rush", similar to Bullet Time.

== Reception ==
Action Half-Life was the favored modification for a small subculture described by Rock, Paper, Shotgun's writer Quintin Smith as a "mad cabal of mappers who obsessed over easter eggs", with some levels containing secret areas much larger and more complex than the main level. These often included whole story-lines, puzzles, and scripted sequences. IGN said the game is a standard shooter aside from the stunts and although they look cool, they get tiresome quickly. PC Games liked the level design and said the game is more suited for experienced players. XtremPC played the beta 2.7 version and said the game is far below the quality of Action Quake 2. CNET Gamecenter placed it on its list of top 10 Half-Life mods, writing: "Action Half-Life, however, manages to capture a sense of danger and suspense that's missing from most frag-a-minute deathmatches."

== See also ==
- List of GoldSrc engine mods
