= Esports Heaven =

Esports website

- Website type: Content/community site
- Available in: English
- Owner: Heaven Media Ltd.
- Website: www.esportsheaven.com
- Registration: Optional
- Launched: Nov 2013
- Current status: Online

Esports Heaven is an esports news and community website, formed from the merging of Cadred.org and tek-9.org in 2013. Cadred was a coverage site for competitive video gaming, or esports, owned by Heaven Media Group, a United Kingdom based marketing agency, which focuses on tech, esports, and gaming clientele.

== Cadred ==
Cadred.org Screenshot 3 March 2009

Cadred was active from 9 July 2006 to 25 November 2013. Cadred was based around a community which grew with an old Finnish esports team, Insignia Cadre. In July 2007 it was decided that the team would continue to operate at the InsigniaCadre.org domain, while the coverage and community site would continue at Cadred.org. On 23 June 2008 it was announced that the Cadred brand had been sold to Heaven Media Group, in a deal apparently worth over £150,000.

=== Site functions ===
Cadred primarily covered three major esports games - Counter-Strike: Source, Counter Strike 1.6 and Call of Duty 4.

=== Partnerships ===
Cadred has partnered with a number of the biggest names in esports, ranging from World Cyber Games (WCG) to "LAN party" events around Europe.

=== Awards ===
In 2009, Cadred had three employees nominated for Journalist of the Year in the annual Esports Awards, organized by ESL FACEIT Group (then known as ESL / Turtle Entertainment). The award was won by Cadred's editor-in-chief Corin Cole for his exposé on how News Corporation's Championship Gaming Series had been forced to shut down after spending fifty million dollars in just two years; Paul Chaloner and Richard Lewis were also nominated to the shortlist.

Cole's winning article was titled "The Rise and Fall of the CGS" and published on Cadred.org.
