= Counter-Strike Online =

2008 video game

- Developer: Nexon
- Publisher: Nexon
- Series: Counter-Strike
- Engine: GoldSrc (Online); Source (Online 2)
- Platform: Microsoft Windows
- Release: Online: TW: July 24, 2008; Online 2: AS: December 2013
- Genre: Tactical first-person shooter
- Mode: Multiplayer

Counter-Strike Online (CSO) is a tactical first-person shooter video game, targeted towards Asia's gaming market released in 2008. It is based on Counter-Strike and was developed by Nexon with oversight from license-holder Valve. It uses a micropayment model that is managed by a custom version of Steam.

== Overview ==
The game features a variety of additions over the international Counter-Strike, such as the introduction of female characters, numerous new weapons and skins for previous weapons. Most of the weapons are "locked" by default, so virtual cash or in-game points are essential to purchase them. Most special weapons, skins, power-ups, etc. can be purchased with cash points. A variety of other special items can also be bought with in-game points as well.

Counter-Strike Online itself is free to play, but some weapons are bought using points purchased with real money. These weapons usually expire after a certain amount of time but sometimes can be purchased permanently during a promotion. Certain weapons and items can be purchased with points that are gained by getting kills, completing objectives, etc.

=== Modes ===
Counter-Strike Online includes classic Counter-Strike modes and added more. They are categorized into six: Classic, Deathmatches, Zombie Infection, Scenarios, Fun, and Others.

- Classic: Round-based match. The modes available are Bomb Defuse, Hostage Rescue, Assassination, and Basic.
- Deathmatches: Players will respawn immediately after death. The modes available are Deathmatch, Team Deathmatch, and Gun Deathmatch.
- Zombie Infection: Humans will survive incoming zombie attacks. The modes available are Zombie 1: Original, Zombie 2: Mutant, Zombie 3: Hero Zombie 4: Darkness, Zombie 5: Evolution, Zombie Z, and Zombie Hero Classic.
- Scenarios: A group of 10 players must survive and annihilate computer-controlled enemies to clear specific goals. Some maps have to defeat a boss. Modes available are Zombie Scenario and Human Scenario.
- Fun: Spin-off modes. Modes available are Hidden, Bazooka Battle, Soccer, Challenge, and Item Battle.
- PvPvE: Player vs Player vs Environment modes that are Zombie Union, Metal Arena, Battle Rush, Zombie Shelter, and Beast.

== Tournaments ==
The World Cyber Games 2012 Grand Finals in Kunshan hosted a Counter-Strike Online tournament, at which teams from China, Taiwan, Malaysia and South Korea competed. The TYLOO team from China won the tournament.

== Sequel ==
On April 5, 2012, Nexon and Valve announced a partnership to develop Counter-Strike Online 2, which is based on an enhanced Source engine and offered enhanced graphics, powerful impact physics, and more new features. It has been confirmed that Counter-Strike Online 2 uses the same Source version as Counter-Strike: Source. However, it is not a copy of CS:S since all the features in the game like models, maps, and sounds are completely rebuilt by Nexon of South Korea.

It was targeted toward Asia's gaming market. The game uses the free-to-play and micropayment business model, similar to its predecessor. It ran a closed beta test on 16 November 2011 and an open beta test in June 2013. After a period of open beta testing, it was released in December 2013 in the Asian markets, but it was closed on April 26, 2018.

Maps in this game are taken from Counter-Strike: Source. Some are heavily modified in terms of graphics, such as Dust II, Inferno, and Italy. The game also adds its own exclusive maps. The weapons are taken from Counter-Strike: Source as well as adding new weapons. The weapon models are heavily modified and reanimated. They are separated into pistols, shotguns, submachine guns, assault rifles, sniper rifles and machine guns. Some weapons can be obtained for free while others can be obtained for points and achievements. Some weapons need the player to collect the given kill points to unlock them.

== Spin-off ==
Counter-Strike Nexon: Zombies was released via Steam on October 7, 2014. This is the first adaptation of Counter-Strike Online to be published via Valve's Steam content delivery system. Counter-Strike Nexon: Zombies was renamed to Counter-Strike Nexon: Studio in 2019, then later renamed to Counter-Strike Nexon in 2024. Counter-Strike Online was discontinued in Singapore/Malaysia (ENGLISH) six months later. As of September 30th, 2026, Counter-Strike Nexon has been shut down.

== Reception ==
Online reviewer MMOhuts gave Counter-Strike Online a 3/5 rating. They noted its similarity to the original game and criticized its lag time outside Southeast Asia, the location of its server hubs. Reviewer NoGameNoTalk was more favorable, touting the online version's new three gaming modes (deathmatch, team deathmatch, and zombie) as a welcome improvement to the original. FilePlanet gave it a moderately good review (7.1/10) for gameplay and weaponry availability, yet citing its lag times outside Asia, as well as the game having a dated look and feel to it.
