= Rural TV =

Television channel

- Country: UK/US
- Broadcast area: UK/Europe/US

Programming
- Picture format: 576i (SDTV 4:3)

Ownership
- Owner: Rural Media Group
- Sister channels: RFD-TV

History
- Launched: March 2, 2009 (UK); February 2012 (US)
- Replaced: Pulse +45mins (UK)
- Closed: June 2, 2010 (UK); January 1, 2013 (US)
- Replaced by: Horse & Country TV (UK); FamilyNet (US)

Links
- Website: www.rfdtv.com

Rural TV was a rural lifestyle and culture television channel, broadcast internationally. It was launched on March 2, 2009, replacing Pulse +45mins. It merged with FamilyNet in 2013.

== Background ==
Rural TV, known as "The World's Rural Channel", was considered to have been the world's first 24-hour international multi-media channel dedicated to serving the needs, and interests, of country people, and those with a passion for rural affairs. Programmes are aimed at enthusiasts for equine, rural lifestyle, and farming, along with traditional country music and entertainment.

The Rural TV website offered video-on-demand and streaming video of the channels content through its "Country Club" membership subscription. In addition, a Rural TV Newsletter, "The Rural Good Times Dispatch" is published bi-weekly.

Rural TV was the international sister channel of RFD-TV. The two channels broadcast a certain amount of each other's programmes. Rural TV International and Rural Media Group, which has distributed TV programming internationally (Which began in 2005), began distributing Rural media content globally. Sales and distribution of the content was handled by London and Nashville offices.

In June 2010, Rural TV ceased as a separate channel, with its programming moved to Horse & Country TV as a series of programming blocks, airing there 7 days a week. In January 2011, Rural TV went to a 24/7 online broadcast. Rural TV was available through an RFD-TV/Rural TV Country Club Membership. The Country Club could be accessed on both the Rural TV and RFD-TV web sites. Rural TV was available on Dish Network Channel 232, which began in February 2012. FamilyNet replaced Rural TV on that Channel space when those two networks merged.

On October 24, 2012, Rural TV purchased FamilyNet & was then announced that FamilyNet would take over the channel space of Rural TV, and did so when the two channels merged on January 1, 2013.
