= Pulse (TV channel) =

British television channel

- Country: United Kingdom

Programming
- Picture format: 576i

Ownership
- Owner: Portland Interactive Ltd

History
- Launched: 16 May 2007
- Closed: 2 March 2009
- Former names: XLeague TV (until February 2008)

Pulse was an entertainment channel focusing on eSports as well as American extreme sports, classic films, and mixed martial arts; it was broadcast in the United Kingdom on British Sky Broadcasting. It ceased operation in March 2009.

== Coverage of eSports ==
The channel was re-branded from XLEAGUE.TV, an eSports channel. Several time-shift channels were available during the time of air - Pulse +30, Pulse +45 and Pulse +1. Pulse +30mins was the first one to be closed down, on 24 November 2008. Pulse +1 was the second, which closed down on 9 November 2008 and was replaced with HiTV. Two days later on 11 November 2008, a second timeshift, Pulse +45mins, was closed down, which suddenly fell off the air. However, it did later return on 24 November 2008 after Pulse +30mins closed down. The Pulse +30mins EPG slot was replaced by OBE TV. Pulse was removed from the Sky EPG on 10 February 2009. Pulse +45mins was replaced by Rural TV on 2 March 2009.

It featured coverage of eSports and, in this respect, it differs from other examples of video game programming in the country, such as Cybernet, which had a broader remit, to cover video games in general. The channel is closely paired to its own self-titled website. The online resource encourages community discussion, while also serving as a platform to organise tournaments and invitational events, some of which may later be screened, on the channel, via its flagship programme, The Match.

While the televised matches regularly feature members of recognised, successful gaming clans such as Team Dignitas, and individual victors of major gaming tournaments including Shaun "Apollo" Clark. Xleague.tv also encourages enthusiasts and non-professionals to get involved in the community (and thus, potentially, The Match) through the game-specific clubs and leagues set up in a way that ensures that players of like strength compete together.

== History ==
The channel started in May 2007 as X League.tv, but in February 2008, it was revealed that the channel had entered into an agreement with US men's entertainment channel MavTV, who had provided the niche sports content, and the channel would be re-branded as Pulse, which would be made up of separately branded XLEAGUE.TV and Mav blocks, with- according to Digital Spy- XLeague are in talks with other providers to provide further programming blocks.

On Monday 25 February 2008, the Xleague.tv channel was rebranded "Pulse". The channel still retains all the Xleague programmes and website, prior to the rebranding.

=== WebTV Beta ===
A YouTube-style section of the website that allows users to upload their videos. Its main focus is on Machinima, voice-over movies using video games to animate their scenes.

== Sources ==
"XLeague TV launches tomorrow" (Press release). Gamesindustry.biz. 2007-05-15.

- OfCom's Licence for Pulse
- Spong.com news report
- GNews Report on Channel's Launch
