= Defense Grid: The Awakening =

2008 video game

- Developer: Hidden Path Entertainment
- Publishers: Hidden Path Entertainment (Win); Microsoft Studios (XBLA); Virtual Programming (OS X)
- Designer: Michael Austin
- Engine: Gamebryo
- Platforms: Microsoft Windows; Xbox 360; OS X
- Release: Microsoft Windows: WW: December 8, 2008; Xbox 360: WW: September 2, 2009; OS X: WW: July 7, 2010
- Genre: Tower defense
- Mode: Single-player

Defense Grid: The Awakening is a tower defense video game developed by Hidden Path Entertainment for Windows and Xbox Live Arcade on the Xbox 360. The game was one of the titles promoted by Microsoft during their Game Developers Conference keynote speech on February 20, 2008. The game was released for Microsoft Windows on December 8, 2008, and for Xbox 360 on September 2, 2009. The OS X version shipped from Virtual Programming on July 7, 2010.

Players must defend military bases from waves of attacking aliens by positioning a range of tower-based weaponry. New levels provided as downloadable content have been developed in the two years since the game's initial release. Reviewers praised the game, with many noting that the quality of the game was high for a budget title.

From July 1 to July 16 of 2013, Microsoft made the game available free to Xbox 360 Gold members. This giveaway was part of Microsoft's "Games With Gold" Program.

== Gameplay ==
A grinder challenge on the Veil of Ice level with health indicators on

The player must defend power cores, which are usually located at a power station, from the invading enemy using ten different tower types. Tower construction is limited to specific platforms. Towers cannot be destroyed by the enemies.

Good tower placement is the key strategic object of the game. Each tower has unique trade-offs that affect ideal placement, such as line-of-sight or ballistic trajectory fire; a large area of effect or damage over time; and minimum and maximum ranges. The "insectoid" enemies arrive in waves and travel along elevated pathways which connect various structures found at the bases. Killing enemies earns resources, which can be used to build more towers and upgrade towers toward two stronger levels. Depending on the tower type an upgrade will provide a more powerful attack, an increased rate of fire and increased range. Tower strength is denoted by the colours green, yellow and red. Towers may be sold (removed) if resources are needed or a player wants to alter pathways. Resources earn interest with the rate increasing the more resources are obtained. The tower defenses are supplemented by the use of an orbital laser which completely destroys all aliens in its blast zone in one strike. The laser is not available in early missions and takes time to recharge. No resources are earned from enemies destroyed by the orbital laser.

During the game, the player battles fifteen types of enemies, each with unique capabilities and strategies. Some aliens are protected by shields which have to be destroyed first before the alien's health will decrease. The aliens will always take the shortest route and some of the aliens fly, requiring towers with aerial weapons for defense. The invaders are able to carry between one and three power cores. If an alien is killed while carrying a core, the orb will slowly float back to the power station. While returning the power core can be grabbed by an alien which will then head for the exit without reaching the power station. A ticker at the top of the screen advises players of the approaching alien wave's formation.

Players have the ability to speed up a game, along with being able to see weapons' range and aerial aliens path, and can also revert to a previously, automatically saved checkpoint. Defense Grid can be viewed at three different levels of zoom. When a level is successfully completed a set of challenges using the same map become available. Players earn medals depending on how well they complete a level. A Steam leaderboard that provides a comparative ranking of player's game scores and other statistics is available.

== Plot ==
The story is based on alien invasion of a planet that has a dormant defense grid. As the player is re-activating the defense system with the assistance of a computer to control the machinery and with only limited resources, the aliens attempt to steal power cores. Power cores are "tiny floating orbs" that provide vital power to the defense grid. Cores are carried by aliens, and when the aliens carrying them die, the cores are dropped, and will slowly float back to their central holder. Once all power cores have been taken from the level, the game is over. Only one power core needs to remain when the last wave of aliens are defeated to complete a level.

Defense Grid is set in the distant future. Most levels feature ancient ruins with defensive military bases built amongst the decaying structures. The game was originally planned to be set amongst an urban environment which has been ravaged by war but that was changed to something more original. The main character in the game, which is called Fletcher, is a computer with human-like qualities that wants to protect his homeworld from destruction.

== Development ==
During development, which started in late 2007, the game was known as Last Stand. The development team were aiming to create a standard tower defense game but in 3D, downloadable and with high production values.

The game was created by Mark Terrano, the lead designer of Age of Empires II: The Age of Kings, and uses the Gamebryo engine. Defense Grid also uses the Scaleform GFx user interface engine. The lead designer for the game was Michael Austin. Lex Story contributed to the design of the 10 different towers which appear in the game.

== Downloadable content ==
Defense Grid: Borderlands was the first set of new levels provided as downloadable content. Defense Grid: Resurgence was announced on 29 May 2010 by Hidden Path Entertainment. The downloadable content is made up of eight new maps, released in installments of two maps each week throughout June 2010. Each map includes a campaign mode and four challenge modes. The content is available for PC and Xbox 360.

In December 2011, Defense Grid: You Monster was released for PC and Xbox 360. Featuring the GLaDOS character from Portal, the add-on pack offers a new story mode of eight levels and 35 challenges. In preparation for the release, Hidden Path updated the core game with user interface enhancements, new game modes and challenge missions.

In December 2012, Hidden Path released four free maps called the Community Levels DLC. These levels were selected from designs submitted by Kickstarter community members using the level visualizer tool given to all backers that pledged $20 or more. The DLC was originally released exclusively to Kickstarter backers in conjunction with the Defense Grid: Containment beta. These levels were later made available to the public for free in exchange for registering to the Hidden Path newsletter.

In January 2013, Defense Grid: Containment was released for PC. It contained 8 maps and a story that bridged the gap between the original Awakening story line and the planned sequel, Defense Grid 2. Kickstarter backers who pledged $50 or more were allowed to test the beta version and were granted pre-release access to the completed DLC.

== Reception ==
Reception

Aggregate score
Aggregator	Score
Metacritic	PC: 81/100; X360: 82/100

Review scores
Publication	Score
Destructoid	7/10
GamePro	4.5/5
IGN	8.9/10
PC Gamer (US)	90%
PC Advisor	4.5/5
GameFocus	9/10
GameShark	B+
Thunderbolt Games	8/10

Award
Publication	Award
PC Gamer	Editor's Choice badge

On December 16, 2009, Gamasutra included Defense Grid on its Best Of 2009: Top 5 Console Downloadable Games. As of years-end 2011 the game sold nearly 116,000 copies on the Xbox 360.

The April 2009 issue of PC Gamer awarded Defense Grid a 90% and an Editor's Choice badge, stating, "Defense Grid is such a charming and challenging experience that shouldn't be missed by tower defense fans. Even if you're not a fan, it may turn you into one." GamePro said, "Defense Grid: The Awakening is a prime example of that sudden transformation of taking an unoriginal, well-known style of video game and turning it into a masterpiece for your PC", awarding the title 4.5 stars out of 5. IGN's 8 out of 10 review stated, "It's an addictive time suck that will have you wishing for more once you've wiped up the last alien." The GameShark review thought Defense Grid was a "solid, well-rounded strategy game". A Thunderbolt Games review thought the game was "a charming little tower defence title with a decent story and challenging gameplay."

The Destructoid review lamented there being only 20 levels. A number of reviewers felt the game would be much better if it came with a level creator. The GamePro review felt some gamers might find the game a little repetitive. A few reviews noted the lack of any multiplayer options. Another review noted that navigating the menus can be a little clumsy.

== Sequel ==
In July 2012, a Kickstarter project was created by Hidden Path Entertainment to help fund a sequel game titled Defense Grid 2. In August 2012, the Kickstarter project failed to reach its ultimate funding goal of US$1,000,000 for Defense Grid 2's development. However, the project did succeed in fully funding development of a new 8 level expansion to the original game which was named Defense Grid: Containment. Hidden Path continued to talk to potential investors in an attempt to secure the funding to develop the aforementioned sequel, and on March 6, 2014, it was announced that Hidden Path had partnered with 505 Games in addition to angel investor Steven Dengler's Dracogen Inc. for the sequel. The sequel was released in September 2014 for Microsoft Windows, OS X, Linux, Xbox One and PlayStation 4.
