= Alpha Response =

2024 video game

- Developer: Ultimo Ratio Games
- Platform: Windows
- Release: October 7, 2024
- Genre: First-person shooter
- Modes: Single-player, multiplayer

Alpha Response is a tactical first-person shooter (FPS) developed by Ultimo Ratio Games, led by Minh Le, also known as "Gooseman", the co-creator of the Counter-Strike mod for Half-Life. It was released in Early Access on Steam on October 7, 2024.

== Gameplay ==
The game casts players as police officers tasked with taking on criminal and terrorist groups. The game is similar to titles like Payday, Left 4 Dead, and SWAT 4, takes inspiration from arcade shooters like Time Crisis and Virtua Cop. Missions in the game include bomb defusal and escort missions. Alpha Response supports solo play or up to four-player co-op. The game does not include player versus player combat.

== Reception ==
PCGamesN reviewed the game positively, calling it "one of the most original and enjoyable shooters you will play this year". Vice also reviewed it positively.
