= Jess Cliffe =

American video game designer

- Jess Cliffe in 2017
- Born: June 27, 1981 (age 45)
- Occupation: Video game designer
- Known for: Co-creator of Counter-Strike

Jess A. Cliffe (born June 27, 1981) is a video game designer who co-created the Half-Life mod Counter-Strike with Minh Le and started the Counter-Strike series. In the first entry of the series, he is the voice of the radio commands, the voiceline "Counter-Terrorists Win!" and various sound effects. He has worked on maps for other Valve titles.

== Education ==
He attended Virginia Polytechnic Institute and State University from 1999 to 2003.

== Career ==
Before getting involved with the original Counter-Strike, Jess Cliffe was a very active gaming website designer. The earliest known gaming website he founded was Jedi Knight Multiplayer Addon Group (JKMAG) which he founded in December 1997. After around a year of maintaining the website, he moved on to start the website Action Quake2 Map Depot. It was during the time he was involved with this site that he got to know Marcelo Dilay and Minh Le, as Dilay and Le were part of the team developing Action Quake 2. Around January 1999, Cliffe also founded the website Silo X devoted to Half-Life maps.

After graduating, Cliffe took a job with Valve, where he was employed as a game designer, 3D artist and level designer. However, he was suspended from Valve in early 2018 due to being arrested.

== Legal history ==
In February 2018, Cliffe was arrested in Seattle on allegations of sexually exploiting a minor after meeting a 16-year-old girl through an adult website. He claimed he believed she was an adult and denied videotaping their encounter, which the girl alleged occurred against her will. Cliffe later wrote on Reddit that he ultimately entered an Alford plea to a reduced charge of second-degree assault and served 57 days in a minimum-security facility; he also stated he was innocent, and that he was a victim of catfishing.

== Works ==
Year	Title	Role
2000	Counter-Strike	Game designer, sound designer, web developer, PR manager
2004	Counter-Strike: Source	Product manager, level designer
2004	Half-Life 2: Deathmatch	Level designer
2005	Day of Defeat: Source	Level designer
2007	Half-Life 2: Episode Two	Level designer
2007	Team Fortress 2	Level designer
2008	Left 4 Dead	Level designer
2009	Left 4 Dead 2	Level designer
2011	Portal 2	Level designer
2012	Counter-Strike: Global Offensive	Level designer

== Bibliography ==
- Vargas, Jose Antonio (2005). "Big Games Hunter." The Washington Post. October 25.
- Wallis, Alistair (2007). "Is Modding Useful?" Game Developer. July 1.
