= Minh Le =

Vietnamese-Canadian programmer (born 1977)

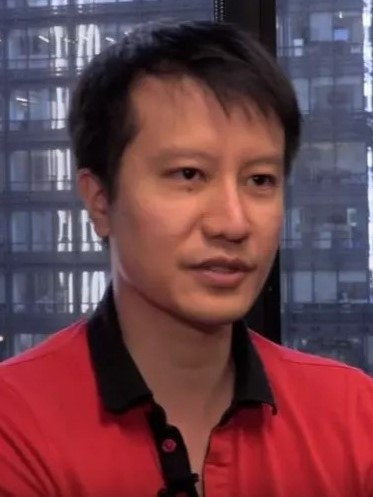
- Minh Le in 2019
- Born: June 27, 1977 (age 49); Vietnam
- Other name: Gooseman
- Education: Simon Fraser University
- Occupation: Video game programmer
- Years active: 1996-present
- Employers: Valve Corporation (2000–2006); FIX Korea (2009–2013); Facepunch Studios (2013–2018); Pearl Abyss (2018–2023)
- Known for: Co-creator of Counter-Strike
- Spouse: Unnamed (m. 2016)

Minh Le (Vietnamese: Lê Minh; born June 27, 1977), also known by his online nickname Gooseman, is a Vietnamese-Canadian video game programmer who co-created the Half-Life mod Counter-Strike with Jess Cliffe in 1999 and started the Counter-Strike series. He was later employed by Valve, the developers of Half-Life, and worked for 8 years in Korea on the multiplayer first-person shooter Tactical Intervention. He is a contractor on the multiplayer survival first-person shooter Rust. In the small-team games that he has worked on, Le has been a programmer, modeler, and designer.

His nickname comes from Shane Gooseman, one of the main characters of 1980s cartoon series The Adventures of the Galaxy Rangers.

== Biography ==
Minh Le was born in Vietnam. In 1979, he and his parents left Vietnam on a boat and immigrated to Canada as refugees.

Le attended Simon Fraser University from 1996 to 2001, graduating in 2001 with a Bachelor of Applied Science degree in Computing Science. His curriculum and electives were "focused mainly on computer graphics courses covering subjects such as compression algorithms, 3D animation techniques, image recognition."

Le picked up id Software's Quake in 1996 and began playing with its software development kit, and after about a year he completed his first mod, Navy SEALs, Counter-Strike's spiritual predecessor. While he was working on the Action Quake 2 mod, he came up with the idea for Counter-Strike and became friends with Action Quake 2's webmaster Jess Cliffe and Marcelo Dilay.

Le began work on Counter-Strike as a mod for Half-Life while he was in the middle of his fourth year at Simon Fraser University (he later graduated with a degree in computer science). He spent about 20 hours a week on making the mod, expending more effort on it than he did on his schoolwork, and released the first beta version in June 1999. The "Counter-Strike Team" quickly produced several more beta releases in the following months as the game's popularity skyrocketed.

By the fourth beta version, Valve, the developer who created Half-Life, began assisting in the development of Counter-Strike. In 2000, Valve acquired the rights to Counter-Strike and hired Le and Cliffe to work at its headquarters Bellevue, Washington. Le continued developing patches for the game until the release of Counter-Strike 1.0, after which he stepped away from the main title and began work on a prototype for Counter-Strike 2. However, after nearly three years of development, the project was shelved when it was only about 25% complete.

With Counter-Strike 2 discontinued, Minh Le turned his attention to developing Day of Defeat: Source. Following its release, he left Valve in 2006 to pursue an independent project. After spending two years working with a small team on the project, he moved to South Korea in 2008 to work with the company named FIX Korea, which provided funding for its continued development. Le's new game was later revealed to be Tactical Intervention, a game similar in style to Counter-Strike created with a modified version of Valve's Source engine.

In October 2013, Minh Le joined Facepunch Studios, where he worked on Rust. He remained at the studio until February 2018, when he departed to join Pearl Abyss the following month. There, he worked on MMOFPS game called PLAN 8. Le left Pearl Abyss in 2023.

Minh Le later continued working in small-team and independent game development. His later projects included Alpha Response, a tactical PvE shooter released in early access. In 2026, Le said he had considered returning to work on Counter-Strike 2, particularly on weapon animations and maps, while also stating that he believed Counter-Strike was "in a really good space".

== Recognition ==
In 2003, a GameSpy editorial cited Minh Le as the most important reason Half-Life was still popular five years after it was released. IGN ranked Jess Cliffe and Minh Le as number 14 in their "Top 100 Game Creators of All Time" list.

== Works ==
Year	Title	Role
2000	Counter-Strike	Game designer, software developer, 3D artist
2005	Day of Defeat: Source	3D artist
2013	Tactical Intervention	Game designer
2018	Rust	3D artist
TBD	Alpha Response	Game designer
