= Counter-Strike: Condition Zero =

2004 video game

- Developers: Ritual Entertainment; Turtle Rock Studios; Valve
- Publisher: Sierra Entertainment (Note: Japanese version published by Capcom. OS X and Linux versions self-published by Valve.)
- Composer: Zak Belica
- Series: Counter-Strike
- Engine: GoldSrc
- Platforms: Windows, OS X, Linux
- Release: Windows: WW: March 23, 2004; OS X, Linux: WW: March 6, 2013
- Genre: First-person shooter
- Modes: Single-player, multiplayer

Counter-Strike: Condition Zero is a first-person shooter video game developed by Ritual Entertainment, Turtle Rock Studios, and Valve, and published by Sierra Entertainment and Valve. The follow-up to Counter-Strike (2000), it was released in March 2004 for Windows. Condition Zero utilizes the GoldSrc engine and has a multiplayer mode, which features updated character models, textures, maps and other graphical tweaks. It also includes two single-player campaigns; Tour of Duty and Condition Zero: Deleted Scenes.

Alongside various other Valve titles, the game received versions for OS X and Linux in 2013.

== Gameplay ==
An in-game round in which the player is using an M4A1

Counter-Strike: Condition Zero, like its predecessor and successors, is a tactical, team-based first-person shooter featuring two opposing teams: Counter-Terrorists and Terrorists. The game has three game modes—single-player, multiplayer and Deleted Scenes.

The multiplayer game mode is similar to Counter-Strike but differs in that the maps are better in quality. The matches follow a round-based structure where players do not respawn until the round ends. Unlike some shooters where weapons are provided at the start of each round, players must purchase their own weapons, armor, and ammunition using in-game money earned through gameplay. The game mode features a reward system where players receive money for completing specific objectives. Eliminating an enemy grants $300, while Terrorists earn $2750 if they successfully plant and detonate the bomb. Counter-Terrorists are awarded $2000 per player for rescuing all hostages or eliminating the opposing team. The maximum amount a player can accumulate is $16000.

Tour of Duty is a single-player game mode featuring short matches with specific objectives. It follows the style of online Deathmatch games but differs in that players do not respawn immediately after dying; instead, the match continues until the objective is completed or time runs out. The mode also restricts players to certain weapons and enforces a time limit to complete objectives. The player begins with a knife as a melee weapon, a standard pistol, and some starting money. They have a five-second grace period to purchase additional weapons and equipment before the round starts. Players can also earn more money after each round to spend on additional weaponry and equipment. After winning an objective, the player gains a reputation point which can be used to upgrade a bot's attributes. AI bots are able to change their tactics, respond to sound and switch routes.

Condition Zero: Deleted Scenes is a separate, linear single-player game mode that features 12 missions. It is the result of Ritual Entertainment's work on the game and stands apart from other Counter-Strike releases due to its inclusion of a storyline and set objectives. Unlike other modes, Deleted Scenes introduces new types of equipment, such as a digital camera, walkie-talkie, blowtorch, remote-controlled bombs, and a fiber-optic camera. The missions are set in various locations around the world, with each mission starting with a briefing. Players are tasked with objectives like bomb defusal or hostage rescue, and are provided with specific loadouts for each mission.

== Development ==
=== Rogue Entertainment design ===
Following the sudden decision by Electronic Arts to cancel the PlayStation 2 port of American McGee's Alice in January 2001, developer Rogue Entertainment was left without a project. To quickly secure new work, Rogue contacted various companies and received several promising job offers. One of the companies Rogue Entertainment approached was Valve Software. Gabe Newell, co-founder of Valve, had long wanted to see single-player missions in Counter-Strike. As a result, Valve offered Rogue Entertainment the opportunity to develop such a project. By April 2001, an agreement was reached for Rogue to begin development on Counter-Strike: Condition Zero. As E3 2001 approached, Rogue Entertainment entered crunch mode to prepare a playable demonstration of the game.

About a month into development, Jim Molinets, the producer at Rogue Entertainment, announced his departure. This news surprised employees at both Rogue and Valve. Rogue assured Valve that Molinets' exit would not impact development, as most of his work had already been completed. However, Valve expressed concerns about Rogue's financial stability and, feeling betrayed, withdrew the project from Rogue's hands.

Rogue Entertainment employees were angered by the decision and leaked details of their negotiations with Valve. Additionally, screenshots allegedly from Rogue's work on Condition Zero surfaced online. The leaked images sparked controversy within the gaming community, with some criticizing the game's visuals as outdated. Bobby Pavlock, a level designer at Rogue, defended the images, explaining that they represented only a few days of work and were not indicative of the final product. Ultimately, losing two major projects in quick succession financially crippled Rogue Entertainment. Many employees departed, leading to the company's acquisition by United Developers later that year.

At Valve Software, development of Condition Zero continued under a team led by Erik Johnson, with a planned release in fall 2001. Due to the lack of official information, public interest in the game grew. On May 14, 2001, Computer Gaming World announced an exclusive preview in an upcoming issue. Shortly before E3, Jess Cliffe confirmed to both CS-Nation and the official Counter-Strike website that Condition Zero would be showcased at the event, which was never done. For unknown reasons, Condition Zero did not appear at E3 2001.

=== Gearbox Software ===
Randy Pitchford, president of Gearbox Software, had been discussing the possibility of working on a Counter-Strike-related project with Valve Software for some time, but prior commitments had prevented Gearbox from pursuing the opportunity. However, by May 2001, Gearbox was nearing the completion of Half-Life: Blue Shift and the PlayStation 2 port of Half-Life, making resources available for a new project. Consequently, Gearbox approached Valve to propose working on Counter-Strike: Condition Zero.

Gearbox and Valve quickly reached an agreement that assigned primary development of Condition Zero to Gearbox. The prior work done by Rogue Entertainment was largely discarded, and Gearbox essentially restarted development. The initial focus was on adding more content, particularly new maps. To assist with content creation, several prominent community designers were recruited, including David Johnston, Christopher Auty, and Alexander Manilov. Additionally, several texture artists, including Mike "MikeZilla" Neumann, joined the project. Another significant addition to the team was Markus Klinge, creator of the original Podbot, who was hired to develop an official bot for the game.

Gearbox Software's version of the game was unveiled to the public in late August 2001. Initially, a Q1 2002 release was planned. The single-player mode took inspiration from console games such as Tony Hawk's Pro Skater, incorporating objectives that rewarded cash for upgrades and equipment purchases. The design at this stage featured over 16 maps across four campaigns, each with approximately 10 objectives.

By November 2001, the game was nearing alpha status. The number of maps had increased to between 20 and 30, organized into five campaigns. By December, the game was considered feature-complete, with 25 maps spread across six campaigns. On February 12, 2002, it was announced that the release had been delayed to Q2 2002 to refine the AI.

At the Game Developers Conference in March 2002, Valve decided to shift the single-player design to a more traditional linear experience, leading to significant changes. This new vision was revealed at E3 2002.

In July 2002, Gearbox Software ceased development on Condition Zero, and Valve took over. Gearbox cited a focus on "future technology and more innovative gameplay" as the reason for their departure. Shortly after, Valve assigned development to Ritual Entertainment, leading to yet another iteration of the game.

=== Ritual Entertainment ===
Following Electronic Arts' decision to cancel the PC port of The Lord of the Rings: The Two Towers in early August 2002, Ritual Entertainment found itself in a difficult situation. The project had been a lucrative one for the company, allowing it to grow to over 50 employees. However, the cancellation left a large portion of Ritual's team without a project.

Just weeks earlier, Gearbox Software had withdrawn from developing the Counter-Strike series, prompting Valve Software to seek a new developer for Counter-Strike: Condition Zero and Counter-Strike Xbox. Valve appointed Ritual to develop the game and provided clear directives for them regarding the single-player campaign, envisioning a Half-Life-meets-Counter-Strike experience. Ritual and Valve redesigned the game from scratch while incorporating some content created by Gearbox.

The primary focus was single-player, but multiplayer was not neglected. Ritual planned to enhance multiplayer with upgraded character and weapon models and new maps. Valve also contracted Turtle Rock Studios to develop a new multiplayer bot. Michael Booth was in charge of designing the bot. On December 6, 2002, Ritual's involvement was first made public, and a week later, their new design was unveiled. A showcase followed at the CPL Winter Tournament on December 20. A trailer was also released the same day.

By E3 2003, the game was nearly complete and featured 19 single-player missions, 10 new multiplayer maps, and expanded faction choices for multiplayer. It was declared "98% complete," however, in June 2003, Ritual faced financial difficulties after completing Star Trek: Elite Force II, leading to layoffs. Despite assurances, Condition Zero remained unreleased, due to quality concerns raised during internal testing. In July, European magazines published mediocre reviews of the game based on review copies. Unbeknownst to Ritual, Valve had decided to overhaul the game, placing Turtle Rock Studios in charge due to their successful bot design.

=== Turtle Rock Studios ===
Turtle Rock Studios had already been involved in the game's development while it was under Ritual Entertainment, particularly in creating the official bots. Internal playtests at Valve Software and early reviews of Ritual's version of the game revealed significant design issues. However, the official bot created by Turtle Rock had been well received by both the community and the press, which led Valve to give Turtle Rock the task of redesigning the game from scratch in June 2003.

Turtle Rock Studios' design drew inspiration from sports games, and the success of the bots allowed them to create flexible, arcade-like missions for the game. The design by Gearbox Software was never officially cited as an influence. The work of Ritual Entertainment was chosen to be included as a bonus game titled Counter-Strike: Condition Zero Deleted Scenes.

On October 8, 2003, Turtle Rock Studios' version of the game was revealed to the public, with plans for the game to go gold by October 10, 2003, and to be released both at retail and on Steam by November 18, 2003.

By November 18, 2003, the game had not yet been released. According to Jess Cliffe, the delay was due to finalization work needed on international versions of the game. This delay became part of Valve's ongoing lawsuit with Vivendi Universal Games, with Valve alleging that Vivendi had intentionally delayed the release of Condition Zero to prevent it from competing during the 2003 holiday season.

Despite the continued uncertainty over the release date, Valve organized a launch party for the game on December 16, 2003, at the House of Shields in San Francisco. The event was announced as being open to those over 21, where attendees could play the final version of the game.

On February 25, 2004, Vivendi Universal Games finally confirmed the game's release date of March 23, 2004. The game was officially released on the same date, almost three years after its initial announcement. Following its release, the game received numerous updates, including new character and weapon models, additional maps, a new radar/location system, and significant changes to the hostage rescue scenario.

On February 21, 2013, a beta version of the game was made available for Linux and Mac OS X, with full support officially released on March 7, 2013.

== Critical reception ==
Reception

Aggregate scores
Aggregator	Score
GameRankings	67%
Metacritic	65/100

Review scores
Publication	Score
Eurogamer	6/10
GameSpot	6.8/10
IGN	7/10

Condition Zero received "mixed or average reviews". It has a score of 65 out of 100 on Metacritic, based on reviews from 33 critics. The game was praised for its AI and new maps, while it was criticized for being out-of-date following its lengthy development.

Tom Bramwell from Eurogamer described the development process as chaotic, with early versions receiving negative feedback for being unpolished and lacking originality. However, he mentioned that the final version from Turtle Rock Studios was closer to the classic Counter-Strike feel, though it did not bring many new ideas. Bob Colayco from GameSpot also noted that the extended development cycle meant the game was outdated by the time it was released, overshadowed by more advanced shooters. Steve Butts from IGN acknowledged the troubled development but pointed out that at least the game was finished. He stated that while it introduced new offline challenges and improved bot AI, it lacked significant new content outside of the single-player modes.

One of the most praised aspects of Condition Zero was its bot AI, which offered a more lifelike challenge. Bramwell highlighted that the bots made tactical decisions, communicated with each other, and even made mistakes like throwing grenades at the wrong time or shooting in panic. Colayco also appreciated the complexity of the bots, though he pointed out that they sometimes failed to complete objectives or got stuck on the environment. Butts agreed, noting that the bots were frustrating at first, often failing tasks like defusing bombs, but later on the bots became more strategic, camping in key spots and communicating better.

The single-player mode, with its Tour of Duty campaign, received mixed reviews. Bramwell appreciated the variety of objectives and how they encouraged different playstyles. Colayco, however, felt that the mode didn't offer enough of a unique experience, since it mostly replicated the multiplayer experience with bots. Butts agreed, noting that while the challenge-based structure was useful for new players, some objectives felt out of place, such as sniping tasks on maps that were not suited for long-range combat and hostage rescue missions not working correctly if all enemies were eliminated before the hostages were rescued.

The Deleted Scenes mode, which followed a more linear, story-driven approach, was also criticized. Colayco found the missions outdated and compared them to older shooters from the late 1990s. Butts criticized the mode's linear design, saying it went against Counter-Strike's usual appeal of freedom and improvisation.

Condition Zero did not bring many changes compared to its predecessor. Bramwell and Colayco pointed out that the multiplayer experience was essentially the same as what was already available for free with Counter-Strike. This led to the criticism that the game lacked a reason to exist, especially for long-time players. Butts was especially critical of the game's value, arguing that while the offline modes added some depth, the $40 price tag was hard to justify.

== Competitive play ==
Condition Zero has been featured in tournament play, although neither Condition Zero nor Counter-Strike: Source was able to generate mass interest from players of the original Counter-Strike as their successor Counter-Strike: Global Offensive did.
