= Hidden Path Entertainment =

American video game developer

Hidden Path Entertainment, Inc.
- Type: Private
- Industry: Video games
- Founded: Bellevue, Washington, U.S. (2006)
- Founder: Michael Austin; Jim Garbarini; Dave McCoy; Jeff Pobst; Mark Terrano
- Headquarters: Bellevue, Washington, U.S.
- Area served: Worldwide
- Products: Defense Grid: The Awakening; Counter-Strike: Source; Counter-Strike: Global Offensive; Age of Empires II HD
- Number of employees: 40
- Website: www.hiddenpath.com

Hidden Path Entertainment, Inc. is an American video game development company based in Bellevue, Washington.

== History ==
Hidden Path was founded in 2006 by Michael Austin, Jim Garbarini, Dave McCoy, Jeff Pobst, and Mark Terrano. In 2008, Hidden Path released its first original title, Defense Grid: The Awakening for Windows and in 2009 for Xbox. A downloadable title, Defense Grid garnered high acclaim with its twist on tower defense and has sold over half a million units since its release. In 2009, Hidden Path began working with Valve to update and maintain Counter-Strike: Source, first released in 2004.

Hidden Path worked with Valve developing Counter-Strike: Global Offensive. CS:GO debuted at PAX Prime 2011 and released on August 21, 2012 for Windows, OS X, PlayStation 3 (PlayStation Network), and Xbox 360 (Xbox Live Arcade), with a Linux version later being released on September 23, 2014.

Continuing the company's trend of revisiting older series, Hidden Path released Age of Empires II: HD Edition on Valve's Steam platform in 2013, which serves as an updated version of Age of Empires II, released in 1999 by Ensemble Studios and Microsoft. In addition to updating the graphics and multiplayer capabilities of the base game and its original expansion, Hidden Path paved the way for a new expansion after 14 years called The Forgotten.

According to Valve, the reason they are often collaborating with Hidden Path Entertainment is that they have known them for a while and their offices are "right around the corner". Hidden Path has also contributed model work on Left 4 Dead 2. They also collaborated with Valve on the You Monster! expansion pack for Defense Grid which features the character GLaDOS from the Portal video game series.

In March 2021, it was announced that Hidden Path was developing "a AAA, third-person, open-world" Dungeons & Dragons game with Whitney "Strix" Beltrán as the narrative director. Jason Schreier, Bloomberg News, commented that the cancellation of multiple unnamed video game projects by Wizards of the Coast in January 2023 led to a small layoff at the company and that "the reorganization will land hard for several independent studios such as Boston-based OtherSide Entertainment and Bellevue, Washington-based Hidden Path Entertainment, both of which were working on games for Wizards of the Coast". However, Polygon reported that "Beltrán confirmed in a tweet that the studio's D&D game is still in development, and that it is actively hiring for the project".

On February 7, 2024, CEO Jeff Pobst announced on LinkedIn that the company would be laying off 44 employees after it was unable to secure funding for an unannounced RPG project.

== List of video games ==
Year	Title	Platform(s)								
Year	Title	LIN	MAC	WIN	PS3	PS4	X360	XONE	Switch	Android
2008	Wits and Wagers (video game)	No	No	No	No	No	Yes	No	No	No
2008	Defense Grid: The Awakening	No	Yes	Yes	No	No	Yes	Yes	No	No
2012	Counter-Strike: Global Offensive	Yes	Yes	Yes	Yes	No	Yes	No	No	No
2013	Age of Empires II: HD Edition	No	No	Yes	No	No	No	No	No	No
Cancelled	Windborne	No	No	Yes	No	No	No	No	No	No
2014	Defense Grid 2	Yes	Yes	Yes	No	Yes	No	Yes	Yes	No
Cancelled	Chroma	Yes	Yes	Yes	No	No	No	No	No	No
2016	Defense Grid 2: Enhanced VR Edition	No	No	Yes	No	No	No	No	No	No
2017	Witchblood	No	No	Yes	No	No	No	No	No	No
2017	Defense Grid 2: Android VR Edition	No	No	No	No	No	No	No	No	Yes
2018	Brass Tactics: Arena	No	No	Yes	No	No	No	No	No	No
2018	Brass Tactics	No	No	Yes	No	No	No	No	No	No
2019	Raccoon Lagoon	No	No	Yes	No	No	No	No	No	No
