= Defense Grid 2 =

2014 video game

- Developer: Hidden Path Entertainment
- Publisher: 505 Games
- Producer: Jeff Pobst
- Designer: John Daud
- Composer: Duane Decker
- Platforms: Windows, OS X, Linux (discontinued), PlayStation 4, Xbox One, Nintendo Switch
- Release: Microsoft Windows, Xbox One, PlayStation 4; September 23, 2014; Linux, OS X; October 15, 2014; Nintendo Switch; February 7, 2019
- Genre: Tower defense
- Modes: Single-player, multiplayer

Defense Grid 2 is a 2014 tower defense video game developed by Hidden Path Entertainment and published by 505 Games. As a sequel to the 2008 Defense Grid: The Awakening, the game was crowd-funded on Kickstarter in 2012 and released on Windows, Xbox One, and PlayStation 4 on September 23, 2014. Linux and OS X versions were released on October 15, 2014, and the Nintendo Switch version was released on February 7, 2019.

== Gameplay ==
Level 1: Threshold. Aliens are approaching the core housing from the entrance on the left. Aliens on the right have already grabbed cores and they're running back to the entrance with them.

The player takes on the role of the commander, tasked with defending bases, colonies, space stations, and outposts from waves of aliens attempting to grab and escape with the power cores housed in each location. The player views the game from a top-down perspective and has the ability to build various towers that attack and route the path for the waves of aliens. Once an alien reaches the power core housing, it will make its way back towards the exit. If the alien is killed on its way back, the core will drop and slowly float back to the core housing. Different towers provide various abilities that are good against different types of aliens so the player must build a strategy to defend the cores against all waves of aliens.

Killing aliens gains resources along with slow generation of interest over time. Resources are used to build and upgrade towers which can be sold at a loss. Tower upgrades increase various statistics including fire power and range. Most towers are similar to those in the original game. However, a new tower type to Defense Grid 2 is the boost tower. It does no damage on its own but it blocks the path of aliens like regular towers and can be used as an inexpensive means of controlling the path of aliens. Additionally, towers built on top of a boost tower allow extra upgrades and a better line-of-sight.

The aliens in Defense Grid 2 come in a variety of types. Some are weak but they run very quickly. Others are slow yet heavily armored. Other types have force field shields. Different towers are effective against each of these kinds of aliens. Waves are queued at the top of the user interface with icons representing what types of aliens will be in the wave, allowing the player to plan their tower placement and strategy ahead of time.

At the beginning of each level, the player can choose a special ability or none at all. Among the options is the orbital laser which makes its return from the original game. The orbital laser allows the player to manually fire a large burst of energy at a group of aliens after it has charged, a process taking several minutes.

== Development ==
Hidden Path Entertainment started their Kickstarter campaign for Defense Grid 2 on July 10, 2012. It received $271,726 on August 14 that year, only enough to fund an 8-level expansion, Defense Grid: Containment, for the original game which bridges the story gap between the original game and Defense Grid 2. The expansion was released on January 23, 2013 after a beta with the Kickstarter backers. However, $1 million was needed to fund the complete sequel so Hidden Path began reaching out to investors. A deal was made with video game enthusiast, DG2 Kickstarter backer, and angel investor Steven Dengler to fund the completion of Defense Grid 2. A suggestion website was made available to backers and later to the general public where people contributed ideas for inclusion in the game. One result of this was the boost tower, a very cheap tower that blocks the path of the aliens and also upgrades other towers built on top of it.

Hidden Path developed their own engine for the game. When the game was nearing completion, publisher 505 Games signed on to make it possible to bring the game to consoles. DG2 was made available to backers with a limited set of levels before its full release on September 23, 2014.

== Reception ==
Reception

Aggregate score
Aggregator	Score
Metacritic	PC: 81/100; PS4: 77/100; XONE: 78/100; NS: 73/100

Review scores
Publication	Score
Eurogamer	8/10
GameRevolution	8/10
IGN	8/10
PC Gamer (US)	83/100
Push Square	8/10

Defense Grid 2 received positive reviews from critics following its release. Aggregating review website Metacritic gave the PC version 81/100, the Xbox One version 78/100, the PlayStation 4 version 77/100, and the Nintendo Switch version 73/100.

Dan Stapleton of IGN gave the game 8/10, praising its replayability factor with the inclusion of modifiers for the towers, maps and levels, while criticizing the writing of the singleplayer campaign's story and the multiplayer gameplay for being "slow and crippled" compared to singleplayer. Emanuel Maiberg of PC Gamer, giving the game 83/100, remarked that the game "isn't doing anything I haven't seen in previous tower defense games, but it does it all so well."
