= Counter-Strike (video game) =

2000 first-person shooter video game

- Developer: Valve (Note: Additional development by Barking Dog Studios. The Xbox version of the game was developed by Ritual Entertainment and Turtle Rock Studios.)
- Publisher: Sierra Studios (Note: The Xbox version of the game was published by Microsoft Game Studios. The OS X and Linux versions were self-published by Valve.)
- Designers: Minh Le; Jess Cliffe
- Programmer: Minh Le
- Series: Counter-Strike
- Engine: GoldSrc
- Platforms: Windows, Xbox, OS X, Linux
- Release: Windows; November 9, 2000; Xbox; NA: November 18, 2003; EU: December 5, 2003; OS X, Linux; WW: February 14, 2013
- Genre: Tactical first-person shooter
- Mode: Multiplayer

Counter-Strike (also known as Half-Life: Counter-Strike or Counter-Strike 1.6) is a 2000 tactical first-person shooter game developed by Valve Corporation and published by Sierra Studios. It is the first installment in the Counter-Strike series.

The game pits two teams—the Counter-Terrorists and Terrorists—against each other in objective-based game modes. The most common objectives are bomb defusal and hostage rescue, each played on designated maps. Players begin with a knife and pistol, and they can purchase more advanced weapons and equipment with money earned through eliminating enemies or accomplishing goals. Once eliminated, players do not respawn until the end of the round.

Minh Le and Jess Cliffe planned a game based on counter-terrorism in 1998 with development beginning the following year when the first few beta versions were released. Their initial version of the game started as a modification for Half-Life and gained significant popularity and interest, which attracted Valve. Valve went on to acquire the game's intellectual property and announced a partnership with Le and Cliffe. After finishing development, Counter-Strike was released by Valve for Microsoft Windows in November 2000. Several remakes and ports were released on Xbox, as well as OS X and Linux.

Since its release, Counter-Strike received positive reviews from critics who praised the gameplay and its emphasis on teamwork and strategy. It has been called one of the most influential first-person shooters and noted for its realistic and tactical approach to counter-terrorism. The game became a major hit, selling millions of copies. Because of this success, multiple subsequent installments were released. The first of these was Counter-Strike: Condition Zero, a single-player campaign released in 2004, which was received with mixed reviews. Counter-Strike: Source came out later that year, which ran on Valve's Source engine, offering improved visuals and physics. In 2012, Counter-Strike: Global Offensive was launched, giving the franchise new game modes and better matchmaking. Counter-Strike 2, developed in the Source 2 engine, was released in 2023 as an update to Global Offensive.

== Gameplay ==
The player standing in the terrorist starting zone (spawn point) of de_dust using a CV-47 (AK-47)

Counter-Strike is a team-based multiplayer first-person shooter video game in which players play as Terrorists (T) or Counter-Terrorists (CT). Each game begins with both teams spawning simultaneously as one of eight possible default character models (four each for Counter-Terrorist and Terrorist). Each player begins with $800, two magazines of ammo, a knife, and a handgun: a Heckler & Koch USP for the Counter-Terrorists or a Glock 18c for the Terrorists. Players are usually allowed a few seconds before the round starts to purchase equipment but not move. They may purchase equipment whenever they are in a buy zone for their team. When players are killed, they become spectators for the rest of the round. They may typically watch the rest of the round from a variety of chosen observer modes. At the end of each round, players receive money for the next round: $3,500 for winning a round, $1,500 for losing one, and $300 for killing an enemy, up to a maximum total of $16,000. Players can be fined, or lose money, by killing a teammate or a hostage.

Depending on the map, there are 3 possible objectives to win (in addition to eliminating all enemy team members):

- Bomb defusal: The Terrorist team has a bomb when the round starts. The goal of the Terrorists is to plant the bomb at a bomb site—maps generally have two called Bombsite A and Bombsite B—and ensure the bomb goes off after a short timer. The Counter-Terrorist team wins if they are able to defuse the bomb within a set time limit or if the time runs out before the bomb is planted. The Terrorist team wins if the bomb successfully detonates. If either team is eliminated before the bomb is planted or the rounds ends, the other team wins. Bomb defusal maps start with the prefix "de_" (e.g de_dust2).
- Hostage rescue: Hostages (non-player characters) are located on the map, generally close to the Terrorist spawn point. The goal of the Counter-Terrorist team is to collect hostages and run to a location on the map where they are rescued. Either team may also win if every member of the opposing team is eliminated. The Terrorists win if the round ends due to timing out. Maps with this objective start with the prefix "cs_" (e.g cs_office).
- Assassination: In this game mode, one Counter-Terrorist member becomes a VIP, armed with a Counter-Terrorist standard-issue USP handgun. The VIP is not permitted to retrieve dropped firearms except their own handgun. Either all the Terrorists die or the VIP must enter an extraction zone within a time limit for the Counter-Terrorists to win. The Terrorists win if the VIP dies or the time limit runs out. Maps with this objective start with the prefix "as_". The VIP gets 200 armor and has 150% movement speed; they also have a unique skin for identification purposes.

Formerly, there was a fourth objective called Escape. In this scenario, the terrorist team had to "escape" to a designated escape point while the Counter-Terrorist team tried to kill them. When half of the team has managed to escape, the Terrorists win the round. Following each of the eight rounds of play, the two sides will trade roles. If one team eliminates the other, either team can win the scenario.

A heads-up display (HUD) shows information to assist players during gameplay. The action indicator in the top right displays the names of players who are killed and the weapon used. The radar, or mini-map, shows the positions of teammates and other relevant map details. The HUD displays the player's health, armor, ammunition, and money as well as the round timer. On the left side, icons indicate important locations such as hostage rescue areas, VIP escape points, buy zones, and bomb sites, and in bomb defusal maps, it shows whether the player is carrying the C4 bomb or a defuse kit.

There are three categories of weapons: melee (knife), secondary (handguns), and primary (rifles, shotguns, machine guns, and submachine guns). Players are only allowed to carry one weapon of each category at a time. There is a separate category for equipment like defusing kits and hand grenades which do not have the same carry limits.

== Development ==
Video game programmer Minh "Gooseman" Le was previously involved in developing video game mods, such as Navy SEALs for Quake and Action Quake 2. However, he wanted to create his own mod to have more control over development. He chose to use the game engine GoldSrc, because he had already worked with the Quake and Quake 2 engines, and he felt it was a logical choice. The realistic setting of Half-Life, which was developed using GoldSrc, made Half-Life well-suited for his concept of a mod involving terrorists and counter-terrorists, a theme inspired by Rainbow Six. Development began in January 1999, but as the Half-Life software development kit (SDK) was not yet released, Le initially created new weapon and player models. In February 1999, the first screenshots of Counter-Strike were released, accompanied by an interview with Le about the mod. Le and Jess Cliffe, who had both worked on Action Quake 2, connected through Internet Relay Chat, during which Le shared his idea for the mod. Cliffe, excited by the concept, offered to create a website for it and became involved in the project.

Several movies served as sources of inspiration for prospective weapon candidates. For instance, the Krieg 552 and M249 were included in Counter-Strike due to inspiration from the 1998 film Ronin. Additionally, the films Air Force One and Léon: The Professional served as further influences for weapon selection. Gun magazines and the Internet were key sources for the team to gather information about the actual firearms used in the game. A few weapon models in Counter-Strike deviate from their real-world counterparts because Le had to make assumptions about how certain weapons would behave in animations due to limited information. The weapons had to not only look and sound good but also feel satisfying to use. Realism, as well as the type of weapons the groups would likely use in real-life scenarios, were prioritized when selecting the weapons for the game.

On March 15, 1999, the mod received its name following an ICQ chat between Le and Cliffe. Le suggested names based on his favorite TV shows and movies, with options like Counterrorism, Counter-Strike, Strike Force, Frag Heads, Counter-Terror, Terrorist Wars, Terror-Force, and Counter Force, and eventually settled on Counter-Strike. The official Counter-Strike web page was launched on March 24, 1999. It was hosted by GameSpy's Joost Schurr on Planet Half-Life. When the Half-Life SDK was released on April 7, 1999, mod development officially began. Minh Le's reputation from Action Quake 2 led to the mod receiving significant attention before release. The website attracted 10,000 visitors within two and a half weeks.

Le focused on the player models, spending 40 hours for each one. Cliffe contributed to the game's design, sound, art and public relations, while closely following the development of Half-Life and reading Gabe Newell interviews. In May 1999, the mod's most pressing issue was a shortage of people to make maps to play on. Despite several requests posted on the official website, the response was minimal. Cliffe began directly contacting Half-Life mappers and reached out to people who had previously submitted maps to Radium, a Half-Life mapping site. A contest was held to select maps for the initial beta, though some maps selected were later discarded.

Before the first beta's official release, a pre-beta build was leaked online, which potentially accelerated the release of the mod. The first beta, released on June 18, 1999, featured a hostage rescue scenario, 9 weapons, 4 maps, and one player model per side. Jess Cliffe reported that the release was well received by the community. Beta 2 and Beta 3 followed, adding new weapons, maps, and factions. Beta 3 introduced the removal of kill counts from the scoreboard, which was controversial and later reversed. Beta 4 introduced the bomb defusal scenario. The interest in the game drew numerous players to Cliffe's website, which helped both him and Le make revenue from advertisements hosted on the site. Another website related to Counter-Strike, a fansite named CS-Nation, was launched by John "rizzuh" Jensen as a source for information about the game, news updates, and skins.

In late 1999, Minh Le began working at Barking Dog Studios while finishing his studies. When Valve Software learned of this, they asked Barking Dog to assist in developing Beta 5, offering to finance the project and acquire the game's intellectual property. Barking Dog mainly handled development, as Le was occupied with his university studies. Valve contributed by cleaning up code, fixing bugs, and enhancing the interface. New hostage models were introduced, and the development of the game was further supported with the release of Beta 5.2. With Beta 6.0, new scenarios, such as assassination and escape, were added. While assassination found moderate success, the escape scenario was later removed.

== Release ==
=== Pre-release ===
On April 12, 2000, Valve Software announced a partnership with the Counter-Strike Team, confirming that Counter-Strike 1.0 would be included in an upcoming Half-Life patch. Though not explicitly stated, it is widely believed that this followed Valve's acquisition of Counter-Strike. Statements suggest the rights were sold in early 2000, involving a financial transaction. Despite the partnership, two more beta versions were released. Beta 6.5 (June 8, 2000) introduced an updated netcode, while Beta 7.0 (August 26, 2000) added drive-able vehicles. Following the acquisition of the game by Valve, while Cliffe continued working for them, Le did additional work towards a Counter-Strike 2.0 based on Valve's upcoming Source engine, but left to start his own studio after Valve opted to shelve the sequel.

Valve planned to release Counter-Strike both as a Half-Life mod and a standalone retail product on August 31, 2000. The decision aimed to increase accessibility and test market demand for a multiplayer game independent of Half-Life. Legal issues arose before the retail release, particularly regarding weapon names, which were changed to fictional alternatives. Valve also had to secure rights for maps and textures, leading to modifications and removals of certain assets. Minh Le, one of the original developers, compensated mappers whose work Valve did not purchase.

=== Post-release ===
The retail version included new content, such as three additional weapons designed by Minh Le and updated player models provided by Valve. Maverick Developments created a training map for the retail edition. On November 9, 2000, Valve announced that the retail version had gone gold, and the mod version was released shortly after. It was launched under the name Half-Life: Counter-Strike because according to Jess Cliffe, the game did not have a strong identity. After launch, Valve continued releasing updates. Version 1.1 implemented a new spectator mode, version 1.3 introduced voice chat, and version 1.4 added anti-cheat measures. Counter-Strike 1.5, released on June 12, 2002, was the last update before transitioning to Steam.

In October 2002, it was stated that Counter-Strike 1.6 would initially be distributed via Steam, with a beta test preceding its official release. Public beta testing was originally set to begin in mid-November, but the launch was first postponed to mid-December before finally starting on January 16, 2003. On the same day, due to overwhelming demand, further beta admissions were quickly suspended as Steam's servers ran out of bandwidth. It was available to the public once again in July 2003. Along with the beta release, Valve and Plantronics announced a blue-and-gold-colored Counter-Strike headset based on Plantronics' DSP-500 headset. The headset had an adjustable microphone boom, a built-in volume control, and was usable with a USB port rather than a sound card.

During the beta phase, the game underwent multiple updates, introducing new weapons and a completely redesigned interface based on Valve's VGUI2 technology. Additionally, the official bot, developed by Turtle Rock Studios for Counter-Strike: Condition Zero, was publicly tested within Counter-Strike 1.6 from June 5. After more than six months of public testing, the beta phase concluded on September 9, 2003. The final release of Counter-Strike 1.6 was initially scheduled for the following day, but last-minute changes to the Steam network caused a brief delay. The final version, along with the Steam client, was officially launched on September 12, 2003.

Following release, advertisements were brought to Counter-Strike. They were removed after the game was converted to the SteamPipe content delivery system. Plans for Counter-Strike 1.7—which aimed to merge the player bases of Counter-Strike and Condition Zero—were never realized. In February 2013, Valve ported Counter-Strike onto OS X and Linux. It is the second Valve game to be ported to Linux, after Team Fortress 2.

=== Controversy ===
The game faced scrutiny in Germany after being linked to the Erfurt school massacre in 2002 after it was found on the computer of the perpetrator, Robert Steinhäuser. Politicians, including Günther Beckstein, and media outlets, particularly Bild, then regularly referred to the game as Killerspiel 'killer game'. Calls for banning violent video games intensified, with politicians like Beckstein advocating for penalties against players. Media outlets like Frontal 21 on ZDF often portrayed players negatively. In 2002, Germany's BPjM considered indexing Counter-Strike but ultimately rejected it, concluding that the game's objectives could be achieved without violence and that its communication aspects were beneficial. Chancellor Gerhard Schröder criticized the decision as irresponsible.

A Brazilian federal judge, Carlos Alberto Simões de Tomaz, ordered a ban on the sale of Counter-Strike and EverQuest in October 2007 arguing that the games "bring imminent stimulus to the subversion of the social order, attempting against the democratic state and the law and against public security". The order began to be enforced on January 17, 2008, but regional federal court order lifting the prohibition on the sale of Counter-Strike was published on June 18, 2009.

== Reception ==
Reception

Aggregate scores
| Aggregator | Score |
|---|---|
| GameRankings | (PC) 89% (Xbox) 73% |
| Metacritic | (PC) 88/100 (Xbox) 74/100 |

Review scores
| Publication | Score |
|---|---|
| Computer Games Magazine | 4.5/5 |
| EP Daily | 9/10 |
| Game Informer | (PC) 9.75/10 (Xbox) 7.5/10 |
| GameRevolution | (PC) A (Xbox) 5/10 |
| GameSpot | (PC) 8.4/10 (Xbox) 7.2/10 |
| GameSpy | (PC) 80/100 (Xbox) 4/5 |
| IGN | (PC) 8.9/10 (Xbox) 6.8/10 |

Awards
| Publication | Award |
|---|---|
| GameSpot | PC Best and Worst of 2000: Best Multiplayer Game, Action Game of the Year (Readers' Choice) |
| Golden Joystick Awards | 2002 edition: Online Game of the Year |
| Game Developers Choice Awards | 2001 edition: Rookie Studio Award, Best Innovation of the Year |

=== Player count ===
Counter-Strike became one of the most popular video games. During the beta stages, it garnered over 245,000 players. After its release in November 2000, the game reached a player count of over 700,000, who played on over 7,000 servers, surpassing both Team Fortress Classic and Unreal Tournament. In March 2002, Counter-Strike was the most popular multiplayer game across 150 game centers in North America. Counter-Strike stayed at the top in June, July, and August.

=== Critical reception ===
==== PC reception ====
Upon its retail release, Counter-Strike received highly favorable reviews. The New York Times reported that E-Sports Entertainment ESEA League started the first professional fantasy e-sports league in 2004 with the game Counter-Strike. Some credit the move into professional competitive team play with prizes as a major factor in Counter-Strike's longevity and success.

The game was praised by critics for its emphasis on teamwork and communication among players. Scott Osborne, writing for GameSpot, felt that the audio messages were a decent feature, which covered requests for backup, status reports and warnings. One problem, according to him, was that both teams used the same voice. Clayton Wolfe of IGN expressed the importance of teamwork and stating, "It's the team-based tactics that make [Counter-Strike] so fun." Computer Games Magazine's Bill Hiles also commented about the social aspects of the game, saying that a player should work in teams rather than alone. Joe Dodson for GameRevolution wrote that "Nothing can beat a coordinated, experienced team in [Counter-Strike], except an even more coordinated and experienced team." He also found the team talk favorable.

Most reviewers agreed that the GoldSrc engine felt dated, but still praised the graphics. Hiles commented that the visuals were acceptable and "do an admirable job portraying outdoor locations", while Dodson noted the graphics were identical to Half-Life. According to Osborne, the game's maps had "imaginative texturing and dramatic lighting effects", but pointed out that they were too dark sometimes. Wolfe felt that the environmental textures were realistic enough.

Critics appreciated the realistic weapon sound effects, with Osborne writing that they made guns "viscerally fun to shoot". Wolfe agreed, but wished "the same amount of attention to detail was given to the rest of the sound in the game". He felt that the crashing thunder was flat and pointed out that footsteps didn't vary based on the surface being walked on. Dodson felt that the animations were dated, but were "nothing to scoff at". Hiles commented that the character model animations needed improvement.

==== Xbox reception ====
The Xbox edition received mixed reviews from critics in comparison to the original game. On the topic of graphics, Matthew Kato from Game Informer wrote that there were "graphical updates here and there" and mentioned the game's inclusion of weather. Greg Kasavin of GameSpot felt that the visuals weren't extraordinary and not enough to make the game "good-looking". IGN's Aaron Boulding mentioned that they were "the biggest disappointment". He commented that the environments were noteworthy in design, but "not in their overall look and level of detail".

The AI technology was a surplus for the Xbox edition, because of critics praising for its human-like behavior. Kato mentioned that the bot AI contained some "human-esque traits" and that it would start to understand the map after some rounds. Kasavin found it surprising that the bots weren't following real-life tactics of terrorists or counter-terrorists, but rather mimic the actions of a player. He pointed out that they would camp at a certain place and follow the orders of a player, such as following them or holding a position.

Many critics also highlighted Xbox Live as one of the main reasons to purchase the game. Kasavin noted that it runs properly, with hosted matches able to hold 10 players. Boulding expressed that "online play over Xbox Live is going to be the greatest reason to buy this game" and that it's convenient. While Xbox Live for Xbox games was terminated in 2010, Counter-Strike is playable online on the revival online servers called Insignia which has restored online functionality to original Xbox games.

=== Awards ===
Counter-Strike earned numerous accolades on its release. In 2000, it was recognized by many gaming magazines and websites as Game of the Year, Action Game of the Year, or Online Game of the Year. The game also won 2 reader polls for Game of the Year from GameSpot US and VoodooExtreme readers. At the Game Developer 2001 Spotlight Awards, Counter-Strike was named Best Multiplayer Game and received a Special Achievement in Gaming.

In 2003, Counter-Strike was inducted into GameSpot's greatest games of all-time list.

=== Sales ===
Counter-Strike became the first fan-made video game to be released commercially. By July 2001, global retail sales of the game had surpassed 250,000 units. By October 2002, sales had exceeded 1.3 million copies. Sales continued to rise, reaching 1.5 million units and generating $40 million in revenue by February 2003.

By August 2004, Counter-Strike had grossed $75 million in revenue and had an estimated two million players worldwide. In the United States, its retail version sold 550,000 copies and earned $15.7 million by August 2006, making it the 22nd best-selling PC game in the country between January 2000 and August 2006. The Xbox version of the game sold 1.5 million copies.

As of December 2008, Counter-Strike had sold approximately 4.2 million copies, surpassing all other Valve games except Half-Life and Half-Life 2.

A portion of Half-Life sales is often attributed to Counter-Strike since the game was originally available as a modification of Half-Life. Half-Life experienced an unusual increase in sales year-over-year following its release, which Gabe Newell attributed to the popularity of Counter-Strike. He described the release of the mod as one of the best things that could have happened to Half-Life.

== Competitive play ==
The original Counter-Strike has been played in competitive tournaments since 2000, with the first major event taking place at the Cyberathlete Professional League (CPL) Winter Championship in 2001. The CPL announced a transition from Quake III Arena to Counter-Strike for the Winter Championship. Prior to this, the 2000 Babbage's event featured a Counter-Strike competition sponsored by Kärna, the parent company of Razer, offering a $15,000 prize pool. However, Kärna experienced financial difficulties, leading to delays in prize payouts. On March 14, 2001, the CPL issued a statement confirming that alternative arrangements would be made if the payments were not received by April 2, 2001.

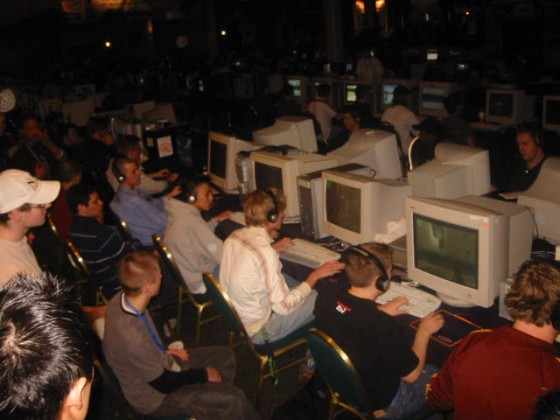
2001 Winter CPL Counter-Strike tournament in Dallas, Texas

On April 12, 2001, the CPL Winter Championship commenced at the Hyatt Regency in Dallas, Texas. The event featured 48 competing teams, marking the first large-scale Counter-Strike tournament. The competition attracted over 800 attendees, including participants and Bring Your Own Computer (BYOC) players. Many professional Quake players were notably absent, while the Counter-Strike community saw an influx of new competitors. This tournament was the largest Counter-Strike event at the time and contributed to the game's rise in professional esports.

In 2003, the Esports World Convention hosted a Counter-Strike tournament which featured 37 teams competing for a $100,000 prize pool.

In 2012, the Electronic Sports League removed the game from the main titles for the 2012–2013 Intel Extreme Masters due to its decreasing popularity outside of Europe.

== Subsequent installments ==
Following the success of Counter-Strike, Valve went on to release multiple installments in the series. The first subsequent game, Counter-Strike: Condition Zero, which used Counter-Strike's GoldSrc engine, was released in 2004. Counter-Strike: Source, a remake of the original Counter-Strike, was the first game in the series to use Valve's Source engine and was also released in 2004, eight months after the release of Condition Zero. The next game in the Counter-Strike series was Counter-Strike: Global Offensive, released for Windows, OS X, Linux, PlayStation 3, and Xbox 360 in 2012. Counter-Strike 2, an updated version of Global Offensive, was released in 2023.

The game spawned multiple spin-offs for the Asian gaming market. The first, Counter-Strike Neo, was an arcade game developed by Namco and released in Japan in 2003. In 2008, Nexon Corporation released Counter-Strike Online, a free-to-play installment in the series monetized via microtransactions. Counter-Strike Online was followed by Counter-Strike Online 2 in 2013. In 2014, Nexon released Counter-Strike Nexon: Zombies worldwide via Steam.

== See also ==
- List of video games derived from modifications
