= Action Quake 2 =

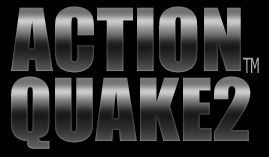
- Developer: The A-Team
- Engine: id Tech 2
- Platforms: BeOS, Linux, Mac OS, Microsoft Windows
- Release: November 12, 1998
- Genre: First-person shooter
- Mode: Multiplayer

Action Quake 2 is a mod for the video game Quake II created by The A-Team. Action Quake 2 was developed to recreate the look and feel of an action movie, having a fast pace and a semi-realistic damage system. It features many maps recreating realistic settings, such as city streets and office buildings, with a balanced range of weapons and equipment inspired by action movies.

Action Quake 2 is essentially a version of deathmatch and team deathmatch in which most of the classic elements have been modified to some degree. Damage to extremities such as a shot to the leg with any weapon will cause damage and bleeding, along with crippling the player's movement until they bandage themselves. Originally released in 1998, there is still an active community of players as of 2024.

== Overview ==
In-game screenshot

With a then unique style of play, realistic weapons and fast pace, Action Quake 2 became one of the most popular Quake II mods. The mod caught the attention of id Software in June 1998, who wished to include it in their upcoming Quake II: Internet Pack No. 1 (Netpack 1): Extremities, a commercial add-on product for Quake II. This expansion CD was released in the U.S. on November 26, 1998, included was the final version 1.0c of Action Quake, along with 11 other publicly available mods, a collection of Quake II deathmatch maps, and player skins. Members of the development team would later go on to work on titles such as Action Half-Life and Counter-Strike.

== Gameplay ==
There are six main modes of gameplay in Action Quake 2: Deathmatch (Free For All) and Teamplay. In Deathmatch, spawn points are distributed over most of the map, and players battle out in a free-for-all fashion in an attempt to get the most kills possible. The map changes when one of two conditions is met: either the timelimit is reached (and whoever has the most frags "wins"), or the fraglimit is reached (and whoever reaches it "wins"). By default, each player spawns with only pistol, and a combat knife. Additional equipment can be picked up throughout the map, but in Action Quake 2 DM all weapons other than pistols, knives, and grenades are "unique", meaning that only one exists on that map at any time. Other modes are variations on these themes including Capture The Flag, team Deathmatch, Espionage and Offline play.

In Teamplay, players are split into two teams and play is round based. Players select one primary weapon and one item to use, in addition to the default pistol and knife. The teams spawn on opposite sides of the map and are then let loose to kill each other. If one team eliminates the other, they win the round.

== Legacy ==
Decades after the release, the game still had an active community in Finland. It sparked a remake using Id Tech 3 called Reaction. An updated standalone version based on the Open-Source release of Quake II called AQtion was re-released on Steam in 2022.
