= Counter-Strike =

Video game series by Valve

- The current Counter-Strike series logo, introduced in 2023 with Counter-Strike 2
- Genre: Tactical first-person shooter
- Developers: Valve; Turtle Rock Studios; Hidden Path Entertainment; Gearbox Software; Ritual Entertainment; Nexon
- Publishers: Valve; Sierra Entertainment; Microsoft Game Studios; Namco; Nexon
- Platforms: Microsoft Windows; macOS; Linux; PlayStation 3; Xbox; Xbox 360
- First release: Counter-Strike; November 9, 2000
- Latest release: Counter-Strike 2 September 27, 2023

Counter-Strike (CS) is a series of multiplayer tactical first-person shooter video games, in which opposing teams attempt to complete various objectives. The series began on Windows in 1999 with the release of the first game, Counter-Strike. It was initially released as a mod for Half-Life that was designed by Minh Le and Jess Cliffe before the rights to the mod's intellectual property were acquired by Valve, the developers of Half-Life, who then turned Counter-Strike into a retail product released in 2000.

The original Counter-Strike was followed by Counter-Strike: Condition Zero, developed by Turtle Rock Studios and released in March 2004. A previous version of Condition Zero that was developed by Ritual Entertainment was released alongside it as Condition Zero: Deleted Scenes. Eight months later, Valve released Counter-Strike: Source, a remake of the original Counter-Strike and the first in the series to run on Valve's then-newly created Source engine. The fourth game in the main series, Counter-Strike: Global Offensive, was released by Valve in 2012 for Windows, OS X, Xbox 360, and PlayStation 3. Hidden Path Entertainment, who worked on Counter-Strike: Source post-release, helped to develop the game alongside Valve. Counter-Strike 2 was announced in March 2023 and publicly released on September 27, 2023, as a replacement for Global Offensive.

There have been several third-party spin-off titles created for Asian markets over the years. These include the Counter-Strike Online series, Counter-Strike Neo, and Counter-Strike Nexon: Studio.

== Gameplay ==
Counter-Strike is an objective-based, multiplayer tactical first-person shooter. Two opposing teams—the Terrorists and the Counter-Terrorists—compete in game modes to complete objectives, such as securing a location to plant or defuse a bomb and rescuing or guarding hostages. At the end of each round, players are rewarded based on their individual performance with in-game currency to spend on more powerful weapons in subsequent rounds. Winning rounds results in more money than losing and completing objectives such as killing enemy players gives cash bonuses. Uncooperative actions, such as killing teammates, result in a penalty.

== Main series ==
Release timeline
2000	Counter-Strike
2001–2003
2004	Counter-Strike: Condition Zero
2004	Counter-Strike: Source
2004	Counter-Strike Neo
2005–2007
2008	Counter-Strike Online
2009–2011
2012	Counter-Strike: Global Offensive
2013	Counter-Strike Online 2
2014	Counter-Strike Nexon: Studio
2015–2022
2023	Counter-Strike 2

=== Counter-Strike ===
Originally a modification for Half-Life, the development team was hired by Valve in 2000, when the company acquired the rights to Counter-Strike.

The game received a port to Xbox in 2003. It was also ported to OS X and Linux in the form of a beta in January 2013. A full release was published in April 2013.

=== Condition Zero ===
Counter-Strike was followed up with Counter-Strike: Condition Zero, developed by Turtle Rock Studios and released in 2004. It used the Half-Life GoldSrc engine, similarly to its predecessor. Besides the multiplayer mode, it also included a single-player mode with a "full" campaign and bonus levels. The game received mixed reviews in contrast to its predecessor and was quickly followed with a further entry to the series titled Counter-Strike: Source.

=== Source ===
Counter-Strike: Source was the first game publicly released by Valve to run on the Source engine. Counter-Strike: Source was initially released as a beta to members of the Valve Cyber Café Program on August 11, 2004. On August 18, 2004, the beta was released to owners of Counter-Strike: Condition Zero and to those who had bought ATI Radeon video cards bundled with a Half-Life 2 voucher. While the original release only included a version for Microsoft Windows, the game eventually received a port to OS X on June 23, 2010, with a Linux port afterwards in 2013.

=== Global Offensive ===
Counter-Strike: Global Offensive is the fourth release in the main, Valve-developed Counter-Strike series in 2012. Much like Counter-Strike: Source the game runs on the Source engine. It is available for Microsoft Windows, OS X, and Linux, as well as the Xbox 360 and PlayStation 3 consoles, and is backwards compatible on the Xbox One console.

=== Counter-Strike 2 ===
On March 22, 2023, Valve announced Counter-Strike 2, which utilizes the Source 2 game engine. It was originally announced as a free upgrade to Global Offensive with a summer 2023 release date. On September 1, 2023, it was released as a limited beta, and the game replaced Global Offensive on September 27.

== Spin-offs ==
=== Neo ===
Counter-Strike Neo (stylized NEO) is a Japanese arcade adaptation of Counter-Strike published by Namco for Linux-based machines. The game is set in a futuristic version of Counter-Strike, with characters featuring anime-like designs. A selection of single-player missions, mini-games, and seasonal events were added to prolong the players' interest on the game.

=== Online series ===
Counter-Strike Online is a free-to-play spin-off available in much of eastern Asia. It was developed by Nexon, with oversight from Valve. It uses a micropayment model that is managed by a custom version of the Steam back-end. Announced in 2012 and aimed at the Asian gaming market, a sequel titled Counter-Strike Online 2 was developed by Nexon on the Source game engine and released in 2013.

=== Nexon ===
In August 2014, Nexon announced Counter-Strike Nexon: Zombies, a free-to-play, zombie-themed spin-off, developed on the GoldSrc game engine. On September 23, 2014, an open beta was released on Steam. The game launched on October 7, 2014, featuring 50 maps and 20 game modes. The game features both player versus player modes such as team deathmatch, hostage rescue, and bomb defusal, alongside player versus environment modes such as cooperative campaign missions and base defending. Reception from critics was generally negative, with criticism aimed at the game's poor user interface, microtransactions, and dated graphics. On October 30, 2019, Counter-Strike Nexon: Zombies was renamed to Counter-Strike Nexon: Studio. On August 21, 2024, Counter-Strike Nexon: Studio was renamed to Counter-Strike Nexon. The game was shut-down on September 30, 2026.

== Competitive play ==
Counter-Strike has over 20 years of competitive play beginning with the original Counter-Strike. The first major tournament was hosted in 2001 at the Cyberathlete Professional League which, along with World Cyber Games and Electronic Sports World Cup, were among the largest tournaments for the Counter-Strike series up to 2007. Since 2013, the Valve-sponsored Counter-Strike: Global Offensive Major Championships have become the most prestigious tournaments in the franchise's history, featuring prize pools of around $1,000,000.

== Reception ==
Counter-Strike is considered one of the most influential first person shooters in history. The series has a large competitive community and has become synonymous with first person shooters. As of August 2011, the Counter-Strike franchise has sold over 25 million units. Because of its popularity, Counter-Strike has attracted considerable academic attention. Researchers have used data from Counter-Strike, among others, to examine the mood of players, performance of obese players, and performance changes since the start of the Russian invasion in Ukraine.
