= Counter-Strike: Source =

2004 video game

- Developers: Valve; Turtle Rock Studios; Hidden Path Entertainment
- Publisher: Valve
- Series: Counter-Strike
- Engine: Source
- Platforms: Windows, Mac OS X, Linux
- Release: October 7, 2004: Windows; WW: October 7, 2004; Mac OS X; WW: June 23, 2010; Linux; WW: February 2013
- Genres: Tactical shooter, first-person shooter
- Mode: Multiplayer

Counter-Strike: Source is a tactical first-person shooter video game developed by Valve and Turtle Rock Studios. Released in October 2004 for Windows, it is a remake of Counter-Strike (2000) using the Source game engine. As in the original, Counter-Strike: Source pits a team of counter-terrorists against a team of terrorists in a series of rounds. Each round is won either by completing an objective (such as detonating a bomb or rescuing hostages) or by eliminating all members of the enemy team. The game was initially bundled with all retail and digital copies of Half-Life 2, before being released standalone.

== Gameplay ==
A screenshot from the map "cs_italy". The player is holding a Maverick M4A1 Carbine.

Counter-Strike: Source retains its team-based objective-oriented first-person shooter style gameplay. The aim of playing a map is to accomplish a map's objective: defusing the bomb, rescuing all hostages, or killing the entire opposing team. The ultimate goal of the game is to win more rounds than the opposing team. Once players are killed, they do not respawn until the next round, though this depends on which server people play on. This gameplay feature distinguishes Counter-Strike from other first-person shooter games, where players respawn instantly or after a short delay.

Shooting while moving dramatically decreases accuracy, and holding the trigger down to continuously shoot produces severe recoil. The severity of damage induced by weaponry is dependent upon the specific locations of hits, with hits to the head being most lethal and shots which make contact elsewhere causing lesser loss of health. Damage is also affected by the distance, and if the target wears protection.

== Development and release ==
Counter-Strike: Source is a remake of the original Counter-Strike built on Valve’s Source engine and the third major installment in the Counter-Strike series. Announced on May 12, 2004 during E3 presentation as the multiplayer component of Half-Life 2, it became the first Source engine game released by Valve Software, arriving on Steam for Windows on October 7, 2004, more than a month before Half-Life 2 itself. The first public beta became available on August 11, 2004 through the Valve Cyber Café Program, followed by a wider beta release on August 18 for owners of Counter-Strike: Condition Zero and users who received Half-Life 2 vouchers bundled with select ATI Radeon video cards. The game was later included in Half-Life 2 retail bundles released on November 16, 2004.

Development of Counter-Strike: Source began at Valve in January 2004, with contributions from the original Counter-Strike creators Minh Le and Jess Cliffe, as well as members of the Day of Defeat team. The main goal of the developers was to transfer Counter-Strike to the Source engine without altering the core gameplay mechanics. To achieve this, the designers took the Counter-Strike 1.1 build, stripped it down to its bare essentials, and rebuilt it piece by piece in the Source engine. They later incorporated features introduced in subsequent Counter-Strike releases, including version 1.6 and Condition Zero. Turtle Rock Studios, which had previously collaborated with Valve on Counter-Strike: Condition Zero and the Xbox port of the original Counter-Strike, later joined the project and helped finalize and polish the initial release.

The Source engine's new capabilities made the game world more interactive, introducing physical objects such as barrels, tires, bottles, and other objects scattered throughout environments that could affect and be affected by their surroundings. The new physics system also affected gameplay, making grenade trajectories, explosions, and their effects more realistic, while allowing them to affect physics-enabled objects. Player bodies after death were likewise redesigned — instead of using predefined death animations, the game introduced ragdoll physics.

The level of texture detail on maps, player models, and weapons was significantly increased, with the resolution of many textures increasing fourfold compared to the original game. 3D models were also improved, featuring substantially higher polygon counts and the ability to cast dynamic shadows. Source made extensive use of advanced DirectX 9 rendering features such as bump mapping, normal mapping, and specularity, giving surfaces greater depth, lighting detail, and reflectivity. To simulate reflections, the cube mapping technology was used extensively; for example, weapons equipped with optical scopes could display reflections of the surrounding environment on the lens when not zoomed in, although physics models were not rendered in those reflections. Source also introduced support for 3D skyboxes, allowing environments to appear as though they stretched for miles beyond the playable area. The sun could now be visibly rendered on the sky texture, further enhancing the game’s visual realism.

Other changes included redesigned sound effects that took advantage of a dynamic audio system to more accurately reproduce environmental acoustics, as well as added support for 5.1 and 7.1 surround sound configurations. In addition, the maximum number of players supported on a server was doubled to 64.

Unlike previous Counter-Strike titles, Counter-Strike: Source launched without the Riot Shield weapon and without the Assassination game mode. At release, the game also contained only one character model per team, while the selection of maps was relatively small, with nine included in total. Many of the launch maps resemble direct ports of classic Counter-Strike maps with redesigned textures and relatively limited environmental detail. However, with the addition of new maps over the following months, the visual quality and level of detail improved significantly, eventually reaching a standard comparable to Half-Life 2.

=== Post-launch updates ===
Following the game’s release, Turtle Rock Studios took the lead in the ongoing development of Counter-Strike: Source, adding new content and features through post-launch updates. From December 2004 to January 2006, the studio remade six classic maps from previous Counter-Strike titles that were missing at launch, introduced bot support, and fixed various bugs and exploits.

During the same period, Valve also expanded the game’s content and visual quality by releasing three maps, including one remake from the original Counter-Strike and two entirely new maps, while also upgrading the default player models. Between December 2005 and April 2006, the remaining classic player models were restored, and in August 2006 the radar was redesigned into a mini-map-style display that introduced enemy detection as part of its updated functionality. In December 2005, Valve introduced HDR lighting technology, which was gradually implemented across several maps throughout 2006.

In November 2006, the Dynamic Weapon Pricing system was introduced, which altered weapon prices weekly based on player demand statistics from the previous week. The system was intended to encourage the use of a wider range of weapons, but faced immediate criticism from the community because prices could fluctuate dramatically, with popular weapons becoming prohibitively expensive while less desirable weapons could become extremely cheap. Despite attempts to improve and rebalance the system, it was eventually abandoned and later removed. The November update also removed the ability to purchase ammunition separately, automatically providing ammo whenever a weapon was bought.

In June 2010, Valve, in collaboration with Hidden Path Entertainment, released a major update that ported the game to an updated version of the Source engine. The change was made to resolve longstanding issues associated with the older engine and allow the developers to benefit from features and bug fixes introduced in other Source games as they became available, including improved graphical effects and more accurate hit registration. The update also introduced numerous gameplay features, including 144 new achievements, MVP Awards, a domination and revenge system adapted from Team Fortress 2, player statistics, a redesigned scoreboard, and the Mac OS X version.

In February 2013, Valve released an official Linux version of the game.

After years of minimal changes, Valve released the first major Counter-Strike: Source update in nearly 12 years on February 18, 2025. The update upgraded the game from 32-bit to 64-bit binaries and made several quality-of-life changes, graphical enhancements, and bug fixes.

== Modifications ==
=== Counter-Strike: Malvinas ===
Counter-Strike: Malvinas is a custom Counter-Strike: Source map, developed and distributed by Argentine web hosting company Dattatec. The map was released worldwide on 4 March 2013. The game is set in Stanley, the capital of the Falkland Islands, and revolves around a group of Argentine special forces (portrayed as the counter-terrorist team) capturing the archipelago from British Royal Marines, who are portrayed as terrorists. The map is inspired by the 1982 Falklands War, in which an estimated 650 Argentine and 255 British servicemen died. The mod prompted strong controversy in the United Kingdom; Dattatec's website was targeted by British hackers on 27 March 2013.

== Reception ==
Reception

Aggregate score
Aggregator	Score
Metacritic	88/100

Review score
Publication	Score
1Up.com	A

Counter-Strike: Source was met with positive reviews from professional critics. Metacritic, a review aggregator website, awarded Source a rating of 88 out of a possible 100 based on 9 critic's reviews. IGN praised the game for its graphical improvements; Jeff Haynes said the game was "much more detailed, featuring many more polygons per model, bump mapping and other graphical enhancements" compared to the original.

== Sequel ==
On August 12, 2011, Valve announced the production of a successor to Counter-Strike: Source, entitled Counter-Strike: Global Offensive. Global Offensive's development began in March 2010 when Hidden Path Entertainment attempted to port Counter-Strike: Source onto video game consoles prior to the end of its lifespan. During its development, Valve saw the opportunity to turn the port into a full game and expand on the predecessor's gameplay. In 2023, Global Offensive was assimilated into Counter-Strike 2, which ported the game's content into the Source 2 engine.

== Competitive play ==
Counter-Strike: Source faced several obstacles in establishing itself as a competitive game following its release in Fall 2004. An GotFrag article published in October 2004, noted that the game initially lacked several maps commonly used in competitive Counter-Strike, including de_nuke, de_train and de_inferno. At the time, the author considered only de_dust2, de_aztec and de_cbble suitable for competitive play, arguing that the limited map pool could discourage tournament organizers and players from adopting the game. The article also highlighted the increased system requirements needed to maintain consistently high frame rates. Combined with the removal of several established competitive maps, these factors posed a significant challenge to CS:S's acceptance among competitive players.

The competitive community was subsequently divided between Counter-Strike 1.6 and Counter-Strike: Source. A 2006 article by Bit-tech described how gameplay and technical changes contributed to dissatisfaction among competitive player base. The article noted that although Valve reintroduced missing classic maps from CS 1.6 in subsequent updates, the map alterations had prioritized aesthetics over gameplay balance. It also pointed out that flashbangs were more powerful and wall penetration (wallbanging) was more limited than in the original game, frustrating players accustomed to its mechanics. The article further described the initial netcode as severely problematic and reported complaints about hitbox registration, particularly the increased difficulty of avoiding headshots. These issues led some players to consider the initial release unfinished.

In 2009, esports journalist Richard Lewis, writing for TechRadar, further criticized the game's suitability for competitive play. He highlighted various issues with the game's mechanics and technical implementation. Lewis explained that the netcode could cause bullets to register far from the player's crosshair, while bunny hopping allowed players to gain speed through repeated strafe jumps and reach certain areas of maps unusually quickly. He also described how delayed hitbox registration made it difficult to hit moving players, particularly those who were bunny hopping. Other issues included crabbing, a visual distortion occurring when a player interrupted a bomb plant, and crouch-bugging, which allowed players to see over obstacles without exposing their heads to opponents. Lewis argued that these inconsistencies made competitive matches difficult to regulate and prevented the game from providing the reliability expected by professional players. He also noted that the differences between CS 1.6 and CS:S meant that success in one version did not necessarily translate to success in the other, contributing to the divide within the competitive community.

=== Competitive leagues ===
Despite the controversy, Counter-Strike: Source received support from several major esports organizations in the early years of its lifespan. The game was included in the competitive program of the World Cyber Games 2005. However, national qualification tournaments could use either Counter-Strike 1.6 or Counter-Strike: Source, and most countries chose the former, requiring their qualifying teams to switch to Source right before the main event. The decision to use CS:S at the WCG drew criticism from the professional scene, as much of the world's top talent continued to play CS 1.6, leaving some teams with limited time to adapt to the new version.

The Cyberathlete Professional League also attempted to establish Counter-Strike: Source as a primary competitive version of Counter-Strike in 2005. Its decision to replace its CS 1.6 tournament with CS:S was met with resistance, and many players boycotted the CPL Summer 2005 Championships, according to HLTV.org. Following the backlash, the CPL reinstated Counter-Strike 1.6 as a tournament discipline for the summer event. In 2007, the CPL again attempted to promote Counter-Strike: Source as its main competitive version, making it the sole Counter-Strike title at the CPL Summer 2007 event. Later that year, the league made a separate tournaments for CS 1.6 and CS:S at CPL Winter, each featuring a $50,000 prize pool, with the winners scheduled to compete in an additional match for the world championship title. The CPL also helped develop the game's competitive infrastructure through the establishment of the US and European divisions of the Cyberathlete Amateur League.

In 2007, the Championship Gaming Series, a professional esports league backed by DirecTV, BSkyB and STAR, adopted Counter-Strike: Source as one of its principal competitive titles. Modelled on traditional professional sports, the league used a franchise-based structure featuring city-based teams, player drafts and salaries. In its first season, six North American franchises fielded five-player CS:S teams alongside competitions in other games, with worldwide player salaries and bonuses announced to exceed $5 million. The league's preference for Counter-Strike: Source over Counter-Strike 1.6 contributed to tensions within the community. Journalist Richard Lewis, a former CGS employee, later described the league's efforts to secure exclusive participation from prominent players and teams, as well as the friction caused by restrictions on competing in outside tournaments. He also recounted the case of Kevin "aZn" Wang, whose contract was terminated after he was fined for participating in a CS 1.6 event without permission. Despite substantial investment in player salaries and television production, the CGS struggled to expand its sponsorship base and television distribution. In November 2008, after two seasons, its owners announced the league's termination, citing its inability to achieve profitability within a sustainable timeframe. Its closure brought an end to one of the period's most prominent attempts to establish a television-oriented professional esports league.
